= List of people executed in New York =

This list of people executed in New York gives the names of some of the people executed in New York, before and after statehood in the United States (including as New Amsterdam), and the person's date of execution, method of execution, and the name of the Governor of New York at the date of execution. 1963 marked the last execution in New York State. Some executions recorded during the 17th and 18th centuries do not indicate the name(s) of the executed and therefore are not included.

Regarding electrocutions, which comprise a large percentage of the executions:

- 55 people (54 men and 1 woman) were electrocuted at Auburn Correctional Facility
- 26 men were electrocuted at Clinton Correctional Facility
- 614 people (including 8 women) were electrocuted at Sing Sing

== 1600–1799 ==
Name of the Convict	Execution Date	Method	Charge	Governor
Gregory Peterson	5 August 1639	Firing squad	Unknown act of mutiny; soldier of the Fort Amsterdam garrison; first execution in New York (Manhattan)	Willem Kieft
Jan Creoli	25 June 1646	Asphyxiation (and posthumous burning)	Sodomy (charged with "Sodomy, buggery, and bestiality")	Willem Kieft
Jacob Leisler	16 May 1691	Hanging	Treason after leading Leisler's Rebellion	Henry Sloughter
25 people	April 1712	Hanging, burning, breaking upon a wheel	New York Slave Revolt of 1712	Robert Hunter
34 people (including John Ury)	April 1741	Hanging, burning	New York Conspiracy of 1741	George Clarke
Thomas Hickey	28 June 1776	Hanging	Irish-born British soldier/deserter convicted of mutiny, sedition and treason against the patriots; he was the first person executed for treason against what would become the United States. He was jailed for passing counterfeit money, tried and executed for above-referenced charges.	William Tryon
Nathan Hale	22 September 1776	Hanging	Convicted of spying for General George Washington, from Connecticut. Last words reported to be "I only regret that I have but one life to lose for my country". A statue is in NYC's "City Hall Park".	William Tryon
Jacob Middagh	12 May 1777	Hanging	Levying war against the state of New York	William Tryon
Seven "Tory criminals"	5 June 1778	Hanging	Robbery	James Robertson (colonial governor)/George Clinton (elected governor)
John André	2 October 1780	Hanging	British spy who recruited Benedict Arnold; assisted in attempted surrender of West Point, New York	James Robertson (colonial governor)/George Clinton (elected governor)
Stephen Grimes	1785	Hanging	Robbery	George Clinton
John Benson	23 September 1785	Hanging	Housebreaking/Burglary	George Clinton
James Carr	1786	Hanging	Housebreaking/Burglary	George Clinton
William Wright	1786	Hanging	Robbery	George Clinton
John Slocum	4 September 1786	Hanging	"Horse stealing"	George Clinton
Caleb Gardner	15 September 1786	Hanging	Passing counterfeit Spanish dollars	George Clinton
Thomas Lee	c. 29 December 1786	Hanging	Housebreaking/Burglary	George Clinton
John Lupton	22 May 1789	Hanging	Robbery	George Clinton
Francis Uss	11 July 1789	Hanging	Breaking open and burglarizing a business establishment in Poughkeepsie, New York	George Clinton
Anthony Cornish	3 August 1789	Hanging	Murder	George Clinton
Henry McKinney	18 December 1789	Hanging	Robbery	George Clinton
Timothy Jackson	18 December 1789	Hanging	Robbery	George Clinton
William Glover	4 June 1790	Hanging	Robbery	George Clinton
Negro Piets	10 December 1790	Hanging	Rape	George Clinton
Samuel Cook (or Samuel Cooke)	24 June 1791	Hanging	Forgery	George Clinton
Whiting Sweeting	26 August 1791	Hanging	Murder of Albany County Constable Darius Quimby on 3 January 1791	George Clinton
William Erskine	5 October 1791	Hanging	Rape	George Clinton
John Young	17 August 1797	Hanging	Murder of New York Deputy Sheriff Robert Berwick 1797	George Clinton

== 1800–1899 ==
Name of the convict	Execution date	Method	Charge	Governor
James McLean	28 August 1807	Hanging	Murder of William Orr	Daniel D. Tompkins
Alpheus Hitchcock	11 September 1807	Hanging	Murder of his wife, Belinda (née Bailey) Hitchcock	Daniel D. Tompkins
Rufus Hill	12 August 1808	Hanging	Murder of Mary Sisson	Daniel D. Tompkins
Thomas Qua	12 August 1808	Hanging	Murder of his wife, Margaret Qua	Daniel D. Tompkins
James Dougherty	6 August 1813	Hanging	Murder of John Wait	Daniel D. Tompkins
John Black, Mahlon Christie, Isaac Kent, and George Orcote	4 June 1814 (other accounts indicate date was in the spring of 1812 or around New Year's Eve 1813)	Shot	Desertion	Daniel D. Tompkins
James Graham	29 July 1814	Hanging	Murders of Hugh Cameron and Alexander McGiffrey	Daniel D. Tompkins
Mary Antoine	30 September 1814	Hanging	"[K]illed a 'female' who had 'alienated her husband's affection'"; daughter of Abram Antoine [q.v.]; first reported execution of a woman in the State of New York.	Daniel D. Tompkins
Charles Thompson and James Peters (aka Peterson)	August 1815	Hanging	Murder of James Burba	Daniel D. Tompkins
Barent Becker	6 October 1815	Hanging	Murder of his wife, Ann Becker	Daniel D. Tompkins
James Hamilton	6 November 1818	Hanging	Murder of U.S. Rifle Corps Major Benjamin Birdsall	DeWitt Clinton
John Van Alstine (aka Van Alstyne)	19 March 1819	Hanging	Murder of Schoharie County Deputy Sheriff William Huddleston	DeWitt Clinton
James "Coe" Teed	16 April 1819	Hanging	Murder of his uncle, Richard Jennings, over property dispute. First "murder for hire" in New York state	DeWitt Clinton
David Dunning	16 April 1819	Hanging	Murder of Richard Jennings	DeWitt Clinton
Abram (or Abraham) Antoine	12 September 1823	Hanging	"[For] avenging the execution of his daughter Mary Antoine [q.v.] by murdering the man [John Jacobs] whose testimony hanged her."	Joseph C. Yates
Peggy Facto	18 March 1825	Hanging	Murder of her newborn daughter (possibly killed the child the year before). Co-defendant/lover Francis LaBarre acquitted.	DeWitt Clinton
William Enoch	12 January 1835	Hanging	Murder of his wife	William L. Marcy
John Hallock	2 July 1836	Hanging	Murder of a black woman	William L. Marcy
Edward Coleman	12 January 1839	Hanging	Murder of his wife	William H. Seward
Samuel Johnson	6 July 1841	Hanging	Murder of his wife	William H. Seward
Antoine Geisler	7 June 1844 sometime between 1 and 2 PM	Hanging	Murder of Alexander Smith and his wife	William C. Bouck
Andreas Hall	15 March 1849	Hanging	Murder of Amy Smith (also responsible for two others, but sentenced only for Smith)	Hamilton Fish
Aaron B. Stookey	19 September 1851	Hanging	Murder of Edward Moore	Washington Hunt
Otto Grunsig	27 February 1852	Hanging	Murder of his wife, Victorine Grunsig	Washington Hunt
Nicholas Saul	28 January 1853	Hanging	Murder of Charles Baxter	Horatio Seymour
William Howlett	28 January 1853	Hanging	Murder of Charles Baxter	Horatio Seymour
Joseph Clark	11 February 1853	Hanging	Murder of NYPD Policeman George T. Gillespie on 10 July 1851	Horatio Seymour
"Black Chas"	29 October 1853	Hanging	Murder of a washerwoman for her money	Horatio Seymour
Patrick Fitzgerald	15 November 1853	Hanging	Murder of his wife, Margaret Fitzgerald	Horatio Seymour
James L. Hoare	27 January 1854	Hanging	Murder of Susan McAnnany	Horatio Seymour
John Hadcock	24 February 1854	Hanging	Murder of Mrs. Mary E. Gregg	Horatio Seymour
Nicholas Behan	15 December 1854	Hanging	Murder of James and Frances Wickham	Horatio Seymour
John Dorsey	17 July 1857	Hanging	Murder of Ann McGirr (a.k.a. Ann Hopkins)	John A. King
James Rogers	12 November 1858	Hanging	Murder of John Swanson	John A. King
James Stephens	3 February 1860	Hanging	Murder of his wife, Sophie Stephens	Edwin D. Morgan
William Fee	March 23, 1860	Hanging	Murder (strangulation) of anonymous woman September 26, 1859 on Wayne County's old Montezuma Turnpike. The only person hanged in Wayne County.	Edwin D. Morgan
John Crummins	30 March 1860	Hanging	Murder of Dennis McHenry	Edwin D. Morgan
Albert W. Hicks	13 July 1860	Hanging	Piracy. Notable because he was the last person to be executed for this crime in the United States (although the execution of the slaver Nathaniel Gordon in 1862 was under the terms of the Piracy Law).	Edwin D. Morgan
Nathaniel Gordon	21 February 1862	Hanging	Slaver	Edwin D. Morgan
Bernard Friery	17 August 1866	Hanging	Murder of Harry Lazarus	Reuben Fenton
Frank Ferris	19 October 1866	Hanging	Murder of his wife, Mary Ferris	Reuben Fenton
Henry Gardner	1 March 1867	Hanging	Murder of Amasa Mullock	Reuben Fenton
George Wagner	1 March 1867	Hanging	Murder of his wife, Mary Wagner	Reuben Fenton
Jeremiah O'Brien	9 August 1867	Hanging	Murder of Lucy McLoughlin (a.k.a. Kate Smith)	Reuben Fenton
William Henry Carswell	8 January 1869	Hanging	Murder of Abbey Elizabeth Sanders	John Thompson Hoffman
Theodore Nicklas	18 March 1870	Hanging	Murder of his uncle, Dr. Andrew Mead	John Thompson Hoffman
John Reynolds	8 April 1870	Hanging	Murder of William Townsend	John Thompson Hoffman
John Real	5 August 1870	Hanging	Murder of NYPD Patrolman John Smedick July 23, 1868 (Officer shot because Real wanted to kill a policeman).	John Thompson Hoffman
John Thomas	10 March 1871	Hanging	Murder of Walter Johnson	John Thompson Hoffman
Edward Rulloff	18 May 1871	Hanging	Murder of Frederick Merrick	John Thompson Hoffman
Charles Eacker	26 May 1871	Hanging	Murder of Thomas E. Burdick	John Thompson Hoffman
Patrick Morrissey	6 September 1872	Hanging	Murder of his mother. (The executioner was future President of the United States Grover Cleveland.)	John Thompson Hoffman
John Gaffney	14 February 1873	Hanging	Murder of Patrick Fahey. (The executioner was future President of the United States Grover Cleveland.)	John Adams Dix
William Foster	21 March 1873	Hanging	Murder of Avery D. Putnam	John Adams Dix
Henry Fralick (or Fralich)	16 April 1873	Hanging	Murder of Henry (or Peter) Schaffer	John Adams Dix
Michael Nixon	16 May 1873	Hanging	Murder of Charles Phifer	John Adams Dix
Hiram Smith	4 December 1874	Hanging	Murder of Charles Wenham	John Adams Dix
William Thompson, William Ellis and Charles Weaver (a.k.a. Charles Weston)	17 December 1875	Hanging	Murder of Abraham Weisberg	Samuel J. Tilden
Johnny Dolan	21 April 1876	Hanging	Murder of James H. Noe	Samuel J. Tilden
Peter H. Penwell	20 July 1877	Hanging	Murder of his wife	Lucius Robinson
Samuel Steenburgh (black)	19 April 1878	Hanging	Murder of Jacob S. Parker	Lucius Robinson
Peter Bresnahan	20 July 1878	Hanging	Murder of Michael Dalthen	Lucius Robinson
William Merrick	29 January 1879	Hanging	Murder of his wife, Julia A. Merrick	Lucius Robinson
Felix McCann	6 June 1879	Hanging	Murder of J. Morris Hatch	Lucius Robinson
Myron A. Buell	14 November 1879	Hanging	Murder of Catharine M. Richards	Lucius Robinson
Chastine Cox	16 July 1880	Hanging	Murder of Jane L. DeForest Hull	Alonzo B. Cornell
Pietro Balbo	6 August 1880	Hanging	Murder of his wife, Maria Dichaco Balbo	Alonzo B. Cornell
Edward Reinhardt	14 January 1881	Hanging	Murder of his wife, Mary Anne Degnan	Alonzo B. Cornell
Owen Lindsley	28 April 1881	Hanging	Murder of Francis Calvin	Alonzo B. Cornell
Nathan Orlando Greenfield	2 July 1881	Hanging	Murder of his wife, Alice	Alonzo B. Cornell
Joseph Abbott	6 January 1882	Hanging	Murder of George Reed, a fellow Elmira Reformatory inmate	Alonzo B. Cornell
Edward Earl (a.k.a. Edward H. Poindexter)	19 February 1882	Hanging	Murder of his wife	Alonzo B. Cornell
William Sindram	21 April 1882	Hanging	Murder of Catharine Craves	Alonzo B. Cornell
Augustus D. Leighton	19 May 1882	Hanging	Murder of Mary Dean	Alonzo B. Cornell
Michael E. "Mike" McGloin	9 March 1883	Hanging	Murder of Louis Hanier	Grover Cleveland
Pasquale Majone	9 March 1883	Hanging	Murder of mother-in-law, Maria Velindino Selta	Grover Cleveland
William Henry Ostrander	10 August 1883	Hanging	Murder of his brother, George Ostrander	Grover Cleveland
Edward Hovey	19 October 1883	Hanging	Murder of sister-in-law, Fanny Vermilyea	Grover Cleveland
Charles Clarke	23 May 1884	Hanging	Murder of his wife, Martha Clarke	Grover Cleveland
William Menken	1885	Hanging	Murder of Mary Bradhoft	David B. Hill
George H. Mills	10 April 1885	Hanging	Murder of his wife	David B. Hill
Miguel Chacón	9 July 1886	Hanging	Murder of Maria Williams	David B. Hill
Roxalana "Roxana" Druse	28 February 1887	Hanging	Murder of her husband William Druse; last woman to be hanged in the State of New York	David B. Hill
Clement Arthur Day	9 February 1888	Hanging	Murder of Johanna Rosa "Josie" Cross	David B. Hill
Oscar Beckwith	1 March 1888	Hanging	Murder of Simon Vandercook	David B. Hill
Danny Lyons	21 August 1888	Hanging	Murder of Joseph Quinn	David B. Hill
Francis Asbury Hawkins, a.k.a. Ashbury Hawkins	11 December 1888	Hanging	Murder of his mother, Cynthia A. Hawkins, on 1 October 1887	David B. Hill
Virgil Jackson	14 March 1889	Hanging	Murder of Norton Metcalf	David B. Hill
John Greenwall (né Johann Theodore Wild)	6 December 1889	Hanging	Murder of Lyman Smith Weeks; last known hanging in the State of New York	David B. Hill
William Kemmler	6 August 1890	Electric chair	Murder of Tillie Ziegler; first use of the electric chair in the world	David B. Hill
Joseph Wood	7 July 1891	Electric chair	Murder of a fellow laborer	David B. Hill
James Slocum	7 July 1891	Electric chair	Murder of his wife	David B. Hill
Levy Smiler	7 July 1891	Electric chair	Murder of his mistress	David B. Hill
Shibuya Jugiro	7 July 1891	Electric chair	Murder of one of his comrades	David B. Hill
Joseph Wood	2 August 1892	Electric chair	Murder	Roswell P. Flower
Carlyle Harris	7 May 1893	Electric chair	Murder of his wife, Helen Potts	Roswell P. Flower
Robert W. Buchanan	1 July 1895	Electric chair	Murder of his wife by poison	Levi P. Morton
Bartholomew Shea	11 February 1896	Electric chair	Murder of election reformer Robert Ross	Levi P. Morton
Carl Feigenbaum	27 April 1896	Electric chair	Murder of Juliana Hoffman, suspected to be Jack the Ripper	Levi P. Morton
Giuseppe Constantino	22 June 1897	Electric chair	Murder of Pietro Galliotti	Frank S. Black
Martin Thorn	1 August 1898	Electric chair	Murder and dismemberment of William Guldensuppe	Frank S. Black
Martha M. Place	20 March 1899	Electric chair	Murder of her stepdaughter, Ida Place; first woman in the world to be executed by use of the electric chair	Theodore Roosevelt

== 1900–1963 ==
All people executed in New York in the 20th century were executed via the electric chair.

Name of the convict	Execution date	Charge	Governor
Frank Vennerholm	16 July 1901	Murder of Emily Adolphson	Benjamin Odell Jr.
Leon Czolgosz	29 October 1901	Murder of U.S. President William McKinley	Benjamin Odell Jr.
James P. "Whitey" Sullivan	24 March 1903	Murder of Matthew Wilson during a bank robbery	Benjamin Odell Jr.
William "Goat" Hinch	6 July 1903	Murder of Matthew Wilson during a bank robbery	Benjamin Odell Jr.
Patrick Conklin	9 September 1903	Murder of wife, Mary Mamie Cassidy	Benjamin Odell Jr.
Willis van Wormer	1 October 1903	Murder of their uncle, Peter Hallenbeck	Benjamin Odell Jr.
Frederick van Wormer	1 October 1903	Murder of their uncle, Peter Hallenbeck	Benjamin Odell Jr.
Burton van Wormer	1 October 1903	Murder of their uncle, Peter Hallenbeck	Benjamin Odell Jr.
Carmine Gaimari	23 November 1903	Murder of a woman whose husband was in debt with Gaimari	Benjamin Odell Jr.
William H. Ennis (policeman) (Note: The name of this inmate is given as William B. Ennis in Robert G. Elliott's "Agent of Death". Ennis was the first policeman executed by the State of New York.)	14 December 1903	Murder of his wife	Benjamin Odell Jr.
Chester Gillette	30 March 1908	Murder of Grace Brown	Charles Evans Hughes
Charles H. Rogers	20 July 1908	Murders of Fred and Willis Onley, and Alice Ingerick	Charles Evans Hughes
Angelo Laudiero	20 July 1908	Murder of Michael DeOmbro	Charles Evans Hughes
Mary Farmer	29 March 1909	Murder of Sarah Brennan	Charles Evans Hughes
Samuel Austin	3 January 1911	Murder of his wife, Irene Austin	John Alden Dix
Dominick Ferrera	6 January 1911	Murder-Robbery of George Phelps, a rent collector (Albany, New York)	John Alden Dix
Vincent Leonardo	6 January 1911	Murder-Robbery of George Phelps, a rent collector (Albany, New York)	John Alden Dix
Samuel Ford	1 February 1911	Murder	John Alden Dix
Joseph Nesce	3 May 1911	Murder	John Alden Dix
Fred Gebhardt	12 June 1911	Murder	John Alden Dix
Joseph Nacco	26 June 1911	Murder	John Alden Dix
Giuseppi Serimarco	17 July 1911	Murder	John Alden Dix
Robert Wood	17 August 1911	Murder	John Alden Dix
Burt Brown	20 November 1911	Murder	John Alden Dix
Pietro Falletta	20 November 1911	Murder-Robbery	John Alden Dix
Frank Schermerhorn	20 November 1911	Murder-Rape	John Alden Dix
Philip Mangano	8 January 1912	Murder	John Alden Dix
Albert Wolter	29 January 1912	Murder-Rape	John Alden Dix
Charles Swenton	5 February 1912	Murder	John Alden Dix
Domenico DiPasquale	18 March 1912	Murder	John Alden Dix
Caruso, C.	20 March 1912	Murder	John Alden Dix
Salvatore Condido	6 May 1912	Murder	John Alden Dix
Nicolo Consuli	28 May 1912	Murder	John Alden Dix
Jacob Kuhn	18 June 1912	Murder-Robbery	John Alden Dix
Ralph Friedman	18 June 1912	Murder-Robbery	John Alden Dix
George Williams	8 July 1912	Murder	John Alden Dix
Giuseppe Cerelli	8 July 1912	Murder	John Alden Dix
Santo Zanza	8 July 1912	Murder of Mrs. Mary Hall	John Alden Dix
Filippo DeMarco	12 August 1912	Murder of Mrs. Mary Hall	John Alden Dix
Angelo Giusto	12 August 1912	Murder of Mrs. Mary Hall	John Alden Dix
Lorenzo Cali	12 August 1912	Murder of Mrs. Mary Hall	John Alden Dix
Salvatore DeMarco	12 August 1912	Murder of Mrs. Mary Hall	John Alden Dix
Vincenzo Cona	12 August 1912	Murder of Mrs. Mary Hall	John Alden Dix
John W. Collins	12 August 1912	Murder of police officer Michael Lynch	John Alden Dix
Joseph Ferrone	12 August 1912	Murder of his wife, Kate	John Alden Dix
John Maruszewski	14 August 1912	Murder	John Alden Dix
Matteo Dell Omo	16 December 1912	Murder	John Alden Dix
Joseph Garfalo	10 February 1913	Murder	William Sulzer
Donato Cardillo	10 February 1913	Murder	William Sulzer
George Bishop	10 February 1913	Murder	William Sulzer
Frederick Poulin	12 February 1913	Murder of Charles Leonard	William Sulzer
William Twiman	31 March 1913	Murder	William Sulzer
William Lingley (alias Harry Miller)	5 May 1913	Murder of Patrick Burns	William Sulzer
John Mulraney	19 May 1913	Murder	William Sulzer
Raffaele Ciavarella	21 May 1913	Murder	William Sulzer
Gregorio Patini	2 June 1913	Murder	William Sulzer
Michael Goslinski	4 June 1913	Murder	William Sulzer
Andrew Manco	2 July 1913	Murder	William Sulzer
Nelson Sharpe	10 December 1913	Murder	Martin H. Glynn
Francis Mulchfeldt	19 January 1914	Murder-Robbery	Martin H. Glynn
Frank Cirofici	13 April 1914	Murder; conspiracy to commit murder (of Herman "Beansie" Rosenthal)	Martin H. Glynn
Harry Horowitz	13 April 1914	Murder; conspiracy to commit murder (of Herman "Beansie" Rosenthal)	Martin H. Glynn
Jacob Seidenshner (aka "Whitey Lewis")	13 April 1914	Murder; conspiracy to commit murder (of Herman "Beansie" Rosenthal)	Martin H. Glynn
Louis Rosenberg (aka "Lefty Louie")	13 April 1914	Murder; conspiracy to commit murder (of Herman "Beansie" Rosenthal)	Martin H. Glynn
Pietro Rebacci	22 June 1914	Murder	Martin H. Glynn
George Coyer	31 August 1914	Murder of his wife, Elizabeth Coyer	Martin H. Glynn
Giuseppe DeGioia	31 August 1914	Murder	Martin H. Glynn
William Bressen	2 September 1914	Murder	Martin H. Glynn
Joseph McKenna	2 September 1914	Murder	Martin H. Glynn
Michael Sarzano	9 December 1914	Murder	Martin H. Glynn
Lee Dock	5 February 1915	Murder	Charles S. Whitman
Eng Hing	5 February 1915	Murder	Charles S. Whitman
Vincenzo Campanelli	26 February 1915	Murder	Charles S. Whitman
Robert Kane	26 February 1915	Murder	Charles S. Whitman
Oscar Vogt	26 February 1915	Murder	Charles S. Whitman
Giuseppe Gino	22 March 1915	Murder	Charles S. Whitman
Vincenzo Buoninsegno	31 May 1915	Murder	Charles S. Whitman
Joseph Ferri	30 June 1915	Murder	Charles S. Whitman
David Dunn	2 July 1915	Murder-Robbery	Charles S. Whitman
Charles Becker	30 July 1915	Murder of Herman "Beansie" Rosenthal	Charles S. Whitman
Samuel Haynes	30 July 1915	Murder	Charles S. Whitman
Karol Draniewicz	27 August 1915	Murder-Robbery	Charles S. Whitman
William Perry	3 September 1915	Murder	Charles S. Whitman
Lewis Roach	3 September 1915	Murder	Charles S. Whitman
Antonio Salemne	3 September 1915	Murder of his wife	Charles S. Whitman
Thomas Tarpey	3 September 1915	Murder	Charles S. Whitman
Pasquale Vendetti	3 September 1915	Murder	Charles S. Whitman
Worthy Tolley	17 December 1915	Murder	Charles S. Whitman
Ludwig Marquardt	17 December 1915	Murder	Charles S. Whitman
Antonio Pontón	7 January 1916	Murder	Charles S. Whitman
Giuseppe Marendi	4 February 1916	Murder	Charles S. Whitman
Father Hans B. Schmidt	18 February 1916	Murder of Anna Aumüller; Schmidt remains the only Roman Catholic priest ever executed for murder in the United States	Charles S. Whitman
Walter Watson	3 March 1916	Murder	Charles S. Whitman
Charles Sprague, II	1 May 1916	Murder	Charles S. Whitman
Roy Champlain	2 June 1916	Murder	Charles S. Whitman
Giovanni Supe	2 June 1916	Murder	Charles S. Whitman
Oresto Shillitani (a.k.a. Harry Shields)	30 June 1916	Murder	Charles S. Whitman
Bradford, Allen	4 August 1916	Murder	Charles S. Whitman
Jan Trybus	1 September 1916	Murder-Burglary	Charles S. Whitman
Joseph Hanel	1 September 1916	Murder	Charles S. Whitman
Thomas Bambrick	7 October 1916	Murder	Charles S. Whitman
Charles Kumrow	19 December 1916	Murder-Robbery	Charles S. Whitman
Stanley Millstein	19 December 1916	Murder	Charles S. Whitman
Petrius C. von den Corput (a.k.a. John Hendricks)	21 April 1917	Murder	Charles S. Whitman
Antonio Impoluzzo	17 May 1917	Murder	Charles S. Whitman
Arthur Waite	24 May 1917	Murder of Hannah and John E. Peck	Charles S. Whitman
Arthur Waltonen	12 July 1917	Murder-Burglary of Mrs. Elizabeth B. Griggs Nichols	Charles S. Whitman
Joseph Mulholland	30 August 1917	Murder-Burglary of Mrs. Elizabeth B. Griggs Nichols	Charles S. Whitman
Alex Shuster	30 August 1917	Murder-Burglary of Mrs. Rose Zamkin	Charles S. Whitman
Hyman Ostransky	13 June 1918	Murder	Charles S. Whitman
Alvah Briggs	13 June 1918	Murder	Charles S. Whitman
Stephan Lischuk	13 June 1918	Murder	Charles S. Whitman
Johann Berg	30 August 1918	Murder	Charles S. Whitman
Giuseppe Roberto	30 August 1918	Murder-Robbery	Charles S. Whitman
Jacob Cohen	19 December 1918	Murder	Charles S. Whitman
Alton Cleveland	9 January 1919	Murder	Al Smith
Giovanni Ferraro	21 March 1919	Murder	Al Smith
Gordon Hamby	29 January 1920	Murder-Robbery	Al Smith
Chester Cantine	13 May 1920	Murder	Al Smith
Richard "Rickey" Harrison	13 May 1920	Murder of Canadian soldier George Griffelns	Al Smith
James Byrd	22 July 1920	Murder of Kingston police officer James M. Lawrence	Al Smith
Elmer Hyatt	29 July 1920	Murder of Patrolman William O’Brien on May 2, 1919.	Al Smith
John Egan	27 August 1920	Murder-Robbery	Al Smith
Frank Kelly	27 August 1920	Murder-Robbery	Al Smith
Walter Bojanowski	9 September 1920	Murder-Robbery	Al Smith
James Cassidy	9 December 1920	Murder-Robbery	Al Smith
Charles McLaughlin	9 December 1920	Murder-Robbery	Al Smith
Joseph Milano	9 December 1920	Murder-Robbery	Al Smith
Joseph Usefof	9 December 1920	Murder-Robbery	Al Smith
Howard Baker	9 December 1920	Murder-Burglary	Al Smith
Augustin Sanchez	27 January 1921	Murder-Robbery	Nathan L. Miller
Henry Garcia	27 January 1921	Murder	Nathan L. Miller
Jess Walker	10 February 1921	Murder-Robbery	Nathan L. Miller
Guy Nichols	13 March 1921	Murder-Robbery	Nathan L. Miller
James Odell	29 April 1921	Murder	Nathan L. Miller
Michael Casalino	5 May 1921	Murder-Robbery	Nathan L. Miller
John Bulge	21 July 1921	Murder	Nathan L. Miller
Harry Van Reed	1 September 1921	Murder-Robbery	Nathan L. Miller
Angelo Giordano	1 September 1921	Murder	Nathan L. Miller
Edward McNally	15 September 1921	Murder	Nathan L. Miller
George Brazee	15 December 1921	Murder	Nathan L. Miller
Raymond Mulford	12 January 1922	Murder-Robbery	Nathan L. Miller
Edward Persons	12 January 1922	Murder	Nathan L. Miller
William Marweg	12 January 1922	Murder-Robbery	Nathan L. Miller
Floyd Slover	2 February 1922	Murder-Robbery	Nathan L. Miller
Harry Givner	2 February 1922	Murder-Robbery	Nathan L. Miller
George McCormick	2 March 1922	Murder	Nathan L. Miller
Lawrence Kubal	23 March 1922	Murder-Rape-Robbery	Nathan L. Miller
Lawrence Torrence	20 April 1922	Murder-Burglary	Nathan L. Miller
Julius Rosenwasser	8 June 1922	Murder-Robbery	Nathan L. Miller
Alberto Librero	8 June 1922	Murder-Robbery	Nathan L. Miller
Luigi Ebanista	8 June 1922	Murder-Robbery	Nathan L. Miller
William Bell	15 June 1922	Murder	Nathan L. Miller
Michael Rossi	29 June 1922	Murder	Nathan L. Miller
Saito Taizo	20 July 1922	Murder	Nathan L. Miller
Peter Nunziato	20 July 1922	Murder-Robbery	Nathan L. Miller
Luther Boddy	31 August 1922	Murder	Nathan L. Miller
Herbert Smith	31 August 1922	Murder-Burglary	Nathan L. Miller
Henry Brown	25 January 1923	Murder	Al Smith
Arlie Westling	15 February 1923	Murder-Robbery of Carl Mollar	Al Smith
Joseph Zampelli	15 February 1923	Murder-Robbery	Al Smith
Anthony Rabasvotch	1 March 1923	Murder	Al Smith
William Evans	26 April 1923	Murder	Al Smith
Joseph Alfano	26 April 1923	Murder	Al Smith
Michael Fradiano	26 April 1923	Murder	Al Smith
Thomas Lester	7 June 1923	Murder	Al Smith
Thomas Kindlon	7 June 1923	Murder	Al Smith
Key Smith	22 June 1923	Murder	Al Smith
George Hacker Jr.	13 December 1923	Murder	Al Smith
Abraham Becker	13 December 1923	Murder	Al Smith
Antonio Viandante	10 April 1924	Murder	Al Smith
Reuben Norkin	17 April 1924	Murder	Al Smith
Alberigo Mastrota	12 June 1924	Murder	Al Smith
Eulogia Lozado	24 July 1924	Murder of Blossom Martin, a nurse; both Lozado and Martin worked in the same doctor's office.	Al Smith
John Emieleta	8 January 1925	Murder and robbery of Lee Jong	Al Smith
John Rys (a.k.a. Joseph Adams)	8 January 1925	Murder and robbery of Lee Jong	Al Smith
Ambrose Geary	15 January 1925	Murder-Robbery	Al Smith
Harry Malcolm	15 January 1925	Murder-Robbery	Al Smith
Edward Smith	15 January 1925	Murder-Robbery	Al Smith
Morris Diamond	April 30, 1925	Murder of the West End bank messengers in Brooklyn	Al Smith
Joseph Diamond	April 30, 1925	Murder of the West End bank messengers in Brooklyn	Al Smith
John Farina	April 30, 1925	Murder of the West End bank messengers in Brooklyn	Al Smith
Florencio Lerma	22 January 1925	Murder	Al Smith
Julius William Miller (a.k.a. "Yellow Charleston)	17 September 1925	Murder of Barron Wilkins	Al Smith
Emil Klatt	28/29 January 1926	Murder	Al Smith
Luigi Rapito	28/29 January 1926	Murder of Asa Kline	Al Smith
Ernest Mimms	4 February 1926	Murder	Al Smith
Matthew Wasser	4 February 1926	Murder-Robbery	Al Smith
Frank Daley	24 June 1926	Murder-Robbery	Al Smith
Sam Wing	15 July 1926	Murder	Al Smith
David DeMaio	19 August 1926	Murder-Robbery	Al Smith
William Hoyer	19 August 1926	Murder-Robbery	Al Smith
Cosimo Brescia	26 August 1926	Murder	Al Smith
John Garguila	26 August 1926	Murder-Robbery	Al Smith
John Brennan (policeman)	2 December 1926	Murder	Al Smith
John Maxwell	9 December 1926	Murder-Robbery	Al Smith
Casimir Barszyouk	9 December 1926	Murder-Robbery	Al Smith
William Barszyouk	9 December 1926	Murder-Robbery	Al Smith
Charles Goldson	6 January 1927	Murder-Robbery of a Manhattan night watchman	Al Smith
Edgar Humes	6 January 1927	Murder-Robbery	Al Smith
George Williams	6 January 1927	Murder-Robbery	Al Smith
Benjamin Bradley	13 January 1927	Murder-Robbery	Al Smith
Michael Kosmowski	20 January 1927	Murder	Al Smith
Paul Hilton	17 February 1927	Murder	Al Smith
Antonio "Tony the Shoemaker" Paretti	17 February 1927	Murders of Nicholas Morello and Charles Ubriaco	Al Smith
Giuseppe Friia	17 March 1927	Murder	Al Smith
Giuseppe Provenzano	17 March 1927	Murder	Al Smith
William Wagner (alias)	14 July 1927	Murder of Peter Basto	Al Smith
Peter Heslin	21 July 1927	Murder	Al Smith
Charles Albrecht	29 September 1927	Murder	Al Smith
George Ricci	16 December 1927	Murder	Al Smith
Peter Seiler	16 December 1927	Murder-Robbery	Al Smith
Charles Doran	5 January 1928	Murder-Robbery	Al Smith
Louis Mason	5 January 1928	Murder-Robbery	Al Smith
Ruth Brown Snyder	12 January 1928	Murder of her husband Albert Snyder with her lover, Judd Gray	Al Smith
Judd Gray	12 January 1928	Murder of Ruth Snyder's husband, Albert Snyder	Al Smith
Phillip Ecker	1 March 1928	Murder	Al Smith
Wilmot Leroy Wagner (Note: The Espy Files erroneously list this man as "William Wagner." William, who was unrelated to Wilmot Leroy Wagner, was executed the year prior for a completely separate robbery/murder of Peter Basto, a hotel employee. Wilmot Wagner was executed in 1928 for murdering two police officers.)	21 June 1928	Murder of two police officers, Robert Roy and Arthur Rasmussen	Al Smith
Joseph Lefkowitz	19 July 1928	Conspiracy to Murder	Al Smith
Ludwig Lie	2 August 1928	Murder	Al Smith
George Appel	9 August 1928	Murder	Al Smith
Daniel Graham	9 August 1928	Murder-Robbery	Al Smith
Alexander Kalinowski	9 August 1928	Murder	Al Smith
Martin Miller	30 August 1928	Murder-Robbery	Al Smith
Thomas Moran	14 December 1928	Murder	Al Smith
Israel Fisher	24 January 1929	Murder-Robbery	Franklin D. Roosevelt
Harry Dreitzer	24 January 1929	Murder-Robbery	Franklin D. Roosevelt
Isidore Helfant	24 January 1929	Murder-Robbery	Franklin D. Roosevelt
John Fabri	29 August 1929	Murder	Franklin D. Roosevelt
Arthur Brown	2 January 1930	Murder-Robbery	Franklin D. Roosevelt
Frank Kowalski	2 January 1930	Murder-Robbery	Franklin D. Roosevelt
John Schlager	9 January 1930	Murder-Robbery	Franklin D. Roosevelt
Frank Plaia	30 January 1930	Murders of Sorro Graziano and his wife, Mary	Franklin D. Roosevelt
Michael Sclafonia	30 January 1930	Murders of Sorro Graziano and his wife, Mary	Franklin D. Roosevelt
Stephen "Bolly" Ziolkowski	29 May 1930	Murder of John Perraton during robbery of Fedders Manufacturing company	Franklin D. Roosevelt
Alex Bogdanoff	17 July 1930	Murder-Robbery	Franklin D. Roosevelt
Max Rybarczyk	17 July 1930	Murder-Robbery	Franklin D. Roosevelt
Stephen Grzechowiak	17 July 1930	Murder-Robbery	Franklin D. Roosevelt
William Force	28 August 1930	Murder	Franklin D. Roosevelt
James Thomas	28 August 1930	Murder	Franklin D. Roosevelt
Claude Udwin	28 August 1930	Murder	Franklin D. Roosevelt
James Bolger	12 December 1930	Murder-Robbery	Franklin D. Roosevelt
James Butler	12 December 1930	Murder-Robbery	Franklin D. Roosevelt
Italo Ferdinandi	12 December 1930	Murder-Robbery	Franklin D. Roosevelt
Anthony Luciano	26 February 1931	Murder-Robbery	Franklin D. Roosevelt
Anthony Velluchio	26 February 1931	Murder-Robbery	Franklin D. Roosevelt
Fred Innes	25 June 1931	Murder	Franklin D. Roosevelt
Haywood Turner	25 June 1931	Murder	Franklin D. Roosevelt
Fred Carmosino	2 July 1931	Murder-Robbery	Franklin D. Roosevelt
Nicholas Leonelli	2 July 1931	Murder-Robbery	Franklin D. Roosevelt
Ferdinand Mangiamele	2 July 1931	Murder-Robbery	Franklin D. Roosevelt
Herbert Johnson	23 July 1931	Murder	Franklin D. Roosevelt
Andrew Metelski	23 July 1931	Murder-Robbery	Franklin D. Roosevelt
Harry Lipschitz	27 August 1931	Murder	Franklin D. Roosevelt
Maurice Seaton	4 September 1931	Murder	Franklin D. Roosevelt
Rudolph Durringer	10 December 1931	Murder-Robbery	Franklin D. Roosevelt
Joseph Senna	14 January 1932	Murder-Robbery	Franklin D. Roosevelt
Francis Crowley	21 January 1932	Murder of police officer Frederick Hirsch	Franklin D. Roosevelt
Gavino Demiar	28 January 1932	Murder-Burglary	Franklin D. Roosevelt
Walter Borowsky	31 March 1932	Murder	Franklin D. Roosevelt
Michael Rodrick	31 March 1932	Murder	Franklin D. Roosevelt
Dominic Scifo	31 March 1932	Murder	Franklin D. Roosevelt
Peter Sardini	31 March 1932	Murder-Robbery	Franklin D. Roosevelt
John Dawson	9 June 1932	Murder	Franklin D. Roosevelt
Frank Giordano	2 July 1932	Murder	Franklin D. Roosevelt
Dominick Odierno	2 July 1932	Murder	Franklin D. Roosevelt
Alfred Cozzi	15 July 1932	Murder	Franklin D. Roosevelt
Alfred Corbellini	15 July 1932	Murder	Franklin D. Roosevelt
Lewis Katoff	22 July 1932	Murder-Robbery	Franklin D. Roosevelt
Frank Mayo	22 July 1932	Murder-Robbery	Franklin D. Roosevelt
Luigi Raffa	22 July 1932	Murder	Franklin D. Roosevelt
George Harris	2 September 1932	Murder	Franklin D. Roosevelt
Joseph Brown	10 December 1932	Murder	Franklin D. Roosevelt
Charles Markowitz	10 December 1932	Murder	Franklin D. Roosevelt
Charles Bates	12 January 1933	Murder	Herbert H. Lehman
Thomas Carpenter	12 January 1933	Murder	Herbert H. Lehman
Alexander Nunes	19 January 1933	Murder	Herbert H. Lehman
William Turner	2 February 1933	Murder-Robbery	Herbert H. Lehman
Alex Kasprzcad	20 April 1933	Murder	Herbert H. Lehman
Bruno Polowicz	20 April 1933	Murder	Herbert H. Lehman
Antonio Lopez	25 May 1933	Murder	Herbert H. Lehman
William Jackson	1 June 1933	Murder	Herbert H. Lehman
Nathaniel Covington	13 July 1933	Murder	Herbert H. Lehman
John Jordan	17 August 1933	Murder-Robbery	Herbert H. Lehman
George Swan	17 August 1933	Murder-Robbery	Herbert H. Lehman
Stephen Witherell	17 August 1933	Murder-Robbery	Herbert H. Lehman
Alex Carrion	24 August 1933	Murder	Herbert H. Lehman
Frank Negron	24 August 1933	Murder	Herbert H. Lehman
John McKinney	1 September 1933	Murder	Herbert H. Lehman
John Tinsley	1 September 1933	Murder-Robbery	Herbert H. Lehman
Henry Edmonds	1 September 1933	Murder-Robbery	Herbert H. Lehman
Lloyd Price	1 March 1934	Murder-Rape	Herbert H. Lehman
Tony Marino	7 June 1934	Murder of Michael Malloy	Herbert H. Lehman
Francis Pasqua	7 June 1934	Murder of Michael Malloy	Herbert H. Lehman
Daniel Kriesberg	7 June 1934	Murder of Michael Malloy	Herbert H. Lehman
Ross Caccamise	14 June 1934	Murder-Robbery	Herbert H. Lehman
William Vogel	14 June 1934	Murder	Herbert H. Lehman
Joseph Murphy	July 5, 1934	Murder of Michael Malloy	Herbert H. Lehman
Frank Canora	12 July 1934	Murder	Herbert H. Lehman
Vincent Saeta	9 August 1934	Murder of Salvatore Antonio	Herbert H. Lehman
Sam Faraci	9 August 1934	Murder of Salvatore Antonio	Herbert H. Lehman
Anna Antonio	9 August 1934	Murder of Salvatore Antonio	Herbert H. Lehman
Giuseppe Leonti	24 January 1935	Murder	Herbert H. Lehman
Alfred Giallorenzi	7 February 1935	Murder	Herbert H. Lehman
Peter Crotty	7 February 1935	Murder	Herbert H. Lehman
William Paskowitz	7 February 1935	Murder	Herbert H. Lehman
Vincent DeLeo	21 February 1935	Murder	Herbert H. Lehman
Stanley Pluzdrak	25 April 1935	Murder	Herbert H. Lehman
Bruno Salek	25 April 1935	Murder	Herbert H. Lehman
Leonard Scarnici	27 June 1935	Murder	Herbert H. Lehman
Eva Coo	27 June 1935	Murder of Henry Wright	Herbert H. Lehman
Patrick Downey	11 July 1935	Murder and rape	Herbert H. Lehman
Alfred Lindsay	29 August 1935	Murder-Robbery	Herbert H. Lehman
Jeff Brown	5 December 1935	Murder	Herbert H. Lehman
Percy Morris	5 December 1935	Murder	Herbert H. Lehman
Ray Orley	9 January 1936	Murder	Herbert H. Lehman
Thomas Rooney	9 January 1936	Murder	Herbert H. Lehman
Amerigo Angelini	9 January 1936	Murder	Herbert H. Lehman
Newman Raymond	9 January 1936	Murder	Herbert H. Lehman
Albert Fish	16 January 1936	Kidnapping and murder of Grace Budd	Herbert H. Lehman
John Smith	16 January 1936	Murder	Herbert H. Lehman
Frank Flynn	27 February 1936	Murder and rape	Herbert H. Lehman
Howard Eichler	16 April 1936	Murder-Robbery	Herbert H. Lehman
Peter Mohlsick	16 April 1936	Murder-Robbery	Herbert H. Lehman
Nick Buckvich	23 April 1936	Murder	Herbert H. Lehman
Vincent DeMartino	29 May 1936	Murder-Robbery	Herbert H. Lehman
Frank Russo	29 May 1936	Murder-Robbery	Herbert H. Lehman
George Rosenberg	29 May 1936	Murder-Robbery	Herbert H. Lehman
Charles Kropowitz	29 May 1936	Murder-Robbery	Herbert H. Lehman
Damiano Consentino	4 June 1936	Murder	Herbert H. Lehman
John Collins	9 July 1936	Murder-Robbery	Herbert H. Lehman
Mary Frances Creighton	17 July 1936	Murder of Ada Appelgate (wife of Everett Appelgate)	Herbert H. Lehman
Everett Appelgate	17 July 1936	Murder of Ada Appelgate (wife of Everett Appelgate)	Herbert H. Lehman
Raymond Flores	23 July 1936	Murder	Herbert H. Lehman
Thomas McFarland	20 August 1936	Murder-Rape	Herbert H. Lehman
Charles Rogas	27 August 1936	Murder	Herbert H. Lehman
Joseph Bolognia	7 January 1937	Murder-Robbery	Herbert H. Lehman
Theodore Didionne	7 January 1937	Murder-Robbery	Herbert H. Lehman
Louis Lazar	14 January 1937	Murder	Herbert H. Lehman
John Fiorenza	21 January 1937	Murder-Rape	Herbert H. Lehman
Frederick Fowler	21 January 1937	Murder-Robbery	Herbert H. Lehman
Charles Ham	21 January 1937	Murder-Robbery	Herbert H. Lehman
Chester White	21 January 1937	Murder-Robbery	Herbert H. Lehman
Alfred Volckmann	11 February 1937	Rape-Murder	Herbert H. Lehman
Wing Chew	10 June 1937	Murder	Herbert H. Lehman
Anthony Garlaus	1 July 1937	Murder-Robbery	Herbert H. Lehman
Watson Edwards	1 July 1937	Murder-Robbery	Herbert H. Lehman
Harry Eisenberg	1 July 1937	Murder-Robbery	Herbert H. Lehman
Major Green	19 August 1937	Murder and burglary	Herbert H. Lehman
Louis Apicello	26 August 1937	Murder	Herbert H. Lehman
Salvatore Ossido	6 January 1938	Murder-Rape	Herbert H. Lehman
James Brown	24 February 1938	Murder-Robbery	Herbert H. Lehman
Terrence Roberts	26 May 1938	Murder-Robbery	Herbert H. Lehman
Lawrence Marks	2 June 1938	Murder-Rape	Herbert H. Lehman
Felix Cummings	11 August 1938	Murder	Herbert H. Lehman
George Lewis	11 August 1938	Murder	Herbert H. Lehman
John Rylowicz	18 August 1938	Murder-Robbery	Herbert H. Lehman
Salvatore Gatti	5 January 1939	Murder	Herbert H. Lehman
David Lucas	5 January 1939	Murder-Robbery	Herbert H. Lehman
Charles Sberna	5 January 1939	Murder	Herbert H. Lehman
Vincente Forte	12 January 1939	Murder-Robbery	Herbert H. Lehman
Joseph O'Laughlin	26 January 1939	Murder	Herbert H. Lehman
Dominick Guariglia	26 January 1939	Murder	Herbert H. Lehman
Arthur Friedman	26 January 1939	Murder	Herbert H. Lehman
Thomas Gilmore	9 February 1939	Murder-Robbery	Herbert H. Lehman
Thomas Bohan	16 February 1939	Murder-Robbery	Herbert H. Lehman
Michael Hermanowski	16 February 1939	Murder-Robbery	Herbert H. Lehman
Michael Alex	23 February 1939	Murder-Robbery	Herbert H. Lehman
Arthur Perry	24 August 1939	Murder-Robbery	Herbert H. Lehman
Anton Myslivec	21 December 1939	Murder	Herbert H. Lehman
Everett McDonald	21 December 1939	Murder	Herbert H. Lehman
Theodore Maselkiewicz	21 December 1939	Murder	Herbert H. Lehman
Anselmo Abreu	4 January 1940	Murder	Herbert H. Lehman
Demetrius Gula	11 January 1940	Murder-Kidnap	Herbert H. Lehman
Joseph Sacoda	11 January 1940	Murder-Kidnap	Herbert H. Lehman
Sidney Markham	18 January 1940	Murder-Robbery	Herbert H. Lehman
Bartel Thingstead	15 February 1940	Murder	Herbert H. Lehman
Frank Jenner	15 February 1940	Murder-Robbery	Herbert H. Lehman
John Kulka	15 February 1940	Murder	Herbert H. Lehman
Gus Schweinberger	25 April 1940	Murder	Herbert H. Lehman
James Pryor	11 July 1940	Murder	Herbert H. Lehman
Oliver Alridge	11 July 1940	Murder	Herbert H. Lehman
Norman Wheelock	1 August 1940	Murder-Rape	Herbert H. Lehman
Frank Blazek	12 September 1940	Murder	Herbert H. Lehman
Benjamin Ertel	12 September 1940	Murder	Herbert H. Lehman
Major Greenfield	9 January 1941	Murder	Herbert H. Lehman
Eugene Brown	6 February 1941	Murder	Herbert H. Lehman
Norman Williams	6 February 1941	Murder	Herbert H. Lehman
Walter Bowling	13 February 1941	Murder-Robbery	Herbert H. Lehman
George Dolny	13 February 1941	Murder-Robbery	Herbert H. Lehman
Arcangelo D'Agosto	13 February 1941	Murder-Robbery	Herbert H. Lehman
David Adler	20 February 1941	Murder-Robbery	Herbert H. Lehman
Hyman Balatnicov	20 February 1941	Murder-Robbery	Herbert H. Lehman
Joseph Carosella	20 February 1941	Murder-Robbery	Herbert H. Lehman
Harry Strauss	12 June 1941	Member of Murder, Inc.	Herbert H. Lehman
Martin Goldstein	12 June 1941	Member of Murder, Inc.	Herbert H. Lehman
Stanley Cole	10 July 1941	Murder-Robbery	Herbert H. Lehman
Dewey Garrett	10 July 1941	Murder	Herbert H. Lehman
George Zeitz	18 September 1941	Murder	Herbert H. Lehman
Isaac Richardson	8 January 1942	Murder-Robbery	Herbert H. Lehman
Ralph Jones	15 January 1942	Murder-Robbery	Herbert H. Lehman
Henry Ancrum	15 January 1942	Murder-Robbery	Herbert H. Lehman
Arturo Renna	22 January 1942	Murder	Herbert H. Lehman
Thomas Conroy	29 January 1942	Murder-Rape	Herbert H. Lehman
Harry Maione	19 February 1942	Conspiracy to Murder (Member of Murder, Inc.)	Herbert H. Lehman
Frank Abbandando	19 February 1942	Conspiracy to Murder (Member of Murder, Inc.)	Herbert H. Lehman
George Joseph Cvek	26 February 1942	Murder of Catherine Pappas, rape and robbery	Herbert H. Lehman
Morris Mardavich	5 March 1942	Murder-Robbery	Herbert H. Lehman
Anthony Esposito	12 March 1942	Murders of Alfred Klausman and NYPD traffic officer Ed Maher	Herbert H. Lehman
William Esposito	12 March 1942	Murders of Alfred Klausman and NYPD traffic officer Ed Maher	Herbert H. Lehman
Charles McGale	11 June 1942	Murder	Herbert H. Lehman
Joseph Riordan	11 June 1942	Murder	Herbert H. Lehman
Edward Hicks	10 September 1942	Murder-Robbery (of Max Graboff)	Herbert H. Lehman
Carlo Barone	10 September 1942	Murder	Herbert H. Lehman
James Clark	17 September 1942	Murder-Robbery	Herbert H. Lehman
Manuel Jacinto (aka Joseph Pinto)	17 September 1942	Murders of James Monti and Mrs. Delores Croyle	Herbert H. Lehman
Lawrence Edwards	17 September 1942	Murder-Robbery	Herbert H. Lehman
Edmund Sileo	14 January 1943	Murder	Thomas E. Dewey
Joseph Sonsky	14 January 1943	Murder	Thomas E. Dewey
Frank Castellano	21 January 1943	Murder	Thomas E. Dewey
Angelo Mendez	21 January 1943	Murder	Thomas E. Dewey
Harold Elling	4 March 1943	Murder	Thomas E. Dewey
John Cullen	29 April 1943	Murder-Robbery	Thomas E. Dewey
Eli Shonbrun	29 April 1943	Murder-Robbery	Thomas E. Dewey
Benitez DeJesus	8 July 1943	Murder of Edwin Berkowitz	Thomas E. Dewey
William Diaz	8 July 1943	Murder of Edwin Berkowitz	Thomas E. Dewey
Edward Haight	8 July 1943	Murders of Helen and Margaret Lynch	Thomas E. Dewey
Anibal Almodovar	16 September 1943	Murder	Thomas E. Dewey
Joseph Mascari	6 January 1944	Murder	Thomas E. Dewey
Louis Buchalter	4 March 1944	Leader of Murder, Inc.	Thomas E. Dewey
Louis Capone	4 March 1944	Member of Murder, Inc.	Thomas E. Dewey
Emanuel Weiss	4 March 1944	Member of Murder, Inc.	Thomas E. Dewey
John Ranford	25 May 1944	Murder-Robbery	Thomas E. Dewey
Louis Parisi	3 June 1944	Murder	Thomas E. Dewey
Gordon Cooke	23 June 1944	Murder	Thomas E. Dewey
Winston Sealy	23 June 1944	Murder	Thomas E. Dewey
Peter DeLutro	29 June 1944	Murder-Robbery	Thomas E. Dewey
Frank DiMaria	29 June 1944	Murder-Robbery	Thomas E. Dewey
Alex Bellomo	29 June 1944	Murder-Robbery	Thomas E. Dewey
Tieh Yun	31 August 1944	Murder	Thomas E. Dewey
York Lew	31 August 1944	Murder	Thomas E. Dewey
George Knight	16 November 1944	Murder-Robbery of George William Fowler; no relation to Helen Ray Fowler	Thomas E. Dewey
Helen Ray Fowler	16 November 1944	Murder-Robbery of George William Fowler; no relation to Helen Ray Fowler	Thomas E. Dewey
Oliver Little	17 January 1946	Murder	Thomas E. Dewey
George Donaldson	7 March 1946	Murder-Robbery	Thomas E. Dewey
Abraham Gold	25 April 1946	Murder	Thomas E. Dewey
Louis Brookins	12 September 1946	Murder-Rape-Robbery	Thomas E. Dewey
Edward Kahkoska	6 March 1947	Murder-Robbery of Tony Marchisella	Thomas E. Dewey
Eugene Koberski	6 March 1947	Murder-Robbery of Tony Marchisella	Thomas E. Dewey
Henry Suckow	6 March 1947	Murder-Robbery of Tony Marchisella	Thomas E. Dewey
William Washington	17 April 1947	Murder-Rape of Rose Palermo	Thomas E. Dewey
Arthur Johnson	17 April 1947	Murder-Rape of Rose Palermo	Thomas E. Dewey
Ward Caraway	3 July 1947	Murder and robbery	Thomas E. Dewey
William Thomas	10 July 1947	Murder	Thomas E. Dewey
Arnold Simms	10 July 1947	Murder-Robbery	Thomas E. Dewey
Edward Jones	10 July 1947	Murder-Robbery	Thomas E. Dewey
Salvator DiCristofaro	10 July 1947	Murder-Robbery	Thomas E. Dewey
Daniel Webster	21 August 1947	Murder	Thomas E. Dewey
Enix Bussey	4 December 1947	Murder-Robbery	Thomas E. Dewey
Jauvham Jackson	8 January 1948	Murder-Robbery	Thomas E. Dewey
Anthony Papa	1 July 1948	Murder-Rape	Thomas E. Dewey
George Moore	22 July 1948	Murder	Thomas E. Dewey
Lester Haughton	22 July 1948	Murder	Thomas E. Dewey
John Reilly	16 September 1948	Murder-Robbery	Thomas E. Dewey
Milton Shaket	16 September 1948	Murder-Robbery	Thomas E. Dewey
Harris Gray	6 January 1949	Murder	Thomas E. Dewey
Louis Smiley	13 January 1949	Murder-Rape	Thomas E. Dewey
George Monge	20 January 1949	Murder-Robbery	Thomas E. Dewey
Willie Grant	20 January 1949	Murder-Robbery	Thomas E. Dewey
Eugene Pannell	20 January 1949	Murder-Robbery	Thomas E. Dewey
William Rosenberg	3 March 1949	Murder	Thomas E. Dewey
Santo Bretagna	3 March 1949	Murder	Thomas E. Dewey
Harold Dupree	30 June 1949	Murder-Robbery	Thomas E. Dewey
Herman Dupree	30 June 1949	Murder-Robbery	Thomas E. Dewey
John M. Dunn	7 July 1949	Murder of Anthony "Andy" Hintz	Thomas E. Dewey
Andrew "Squint" Sheridan	7 July 1949	Murder of Anthony "Andy" Hintz	Thomas E. Dewey
Floyd Arrington	1 September 1949	Murder-Robbery	Thomas E. Dewey
William Jackson	1 September 1949	Murder-Robbery	Thomas E. Dewey
Walter Davis	8 September 1949	Murder-Robbery	Thomas E. Dewey
Frank Bruno	5 January 1950	Murder	Thomas E. Dewey
George Reeh	12 January 1950	Murder-Robbery	Thomas E. Dewey
Julio Perez	25 May 1950	Murder-Burglary	Thomas E. Dewey
Harley Lamarr	11 January 1951	Murder-Robbery-Kidnapping	Thomas E. Dewey
Willie Bunch	15 February 1951	Murder-Robbery	Thomas E. Dewey
Gilberto Walker	1 March 1951	Murder-Robbery	Thomas E. Dewey
Raymond Fernandez	8 March 1951	Murders of Janet Fay, Delphine Downing, and Rainelle Downing	Thomas E. Dewey
Martha Beck	8 March 1951	Murders of Janet Fay, Delphine Downing, and Rainelle Downing	Thomas E. Dewey
Richard Power	8 March 1951	Murder-Robbery	Thomas E. Dewey
John King	8 March 1951	Murder-Robbery	Thomas E. Dewey
John Saiu	12 April 1951	Murder	Thomas E. Dewey
Edward Kelly	30 January 1952	Murder	Thomas E. Dewey
Wallace Ford Jr.	30 January 1952	Murder	Thomas E. Dewey
Bernard Stein	6 March 1952	Murder	Thomas E. Dewey
Joseph Paonessa	15 January 1953	Murder-Kidnap	Thomas E. Dewey
Stephen Lewis	22 January 1953	Murder	Thomas E. Dewey
Frank Wojcik	16 April 1953	Murder	Thomas E. Dewey
Julius Rosenberg (federal execution)	19 June 1953	Espionage	Thomas E. Dewey
Ethel Rosenberg (federal execution)	19 June 1953	Espionage	Thomas E. Dewey
Donald Snyder	16 July 1953	Murder	Thomas E. Dewey
William Draper	23 July 1953	Murder	Thomas E. Dewey
Walter Griffen	7 January 1954	Murder-Robbery	Thomas E. Dewey
Maurice Odell	7 January 1954	Murder-Robbery	Thomas E. Dewey
Henry Allen	11 March 1954	Murder	Thomas E. Dewey
John Martin	11 March 1954	Murder	Thomas E. Dewey
Emile Scott	15 July 1954	Murder	Thomas E. Dewey
William Vanderwyde	22 July 1954	Murder	Thomas E. Dewey
Gerhard Arthur Puff (federal execution)	12 August 1954	Murder of FBI Special Agent Joseph John Brock	Thomas E. Dewey
Barry Jacobs	26 August 1954	Murder-Robbery	Thomas E. Dewey
John Green	26 August 1954	Murder-Robbery	Thomas E. Dewey
Henry Matthews	10 February 1955	Murder	Averell Harriman
Romulo Rosario	17 February 1955	Murder	Averell Harriman
Calman Cooper	9 July 1955	Murder-Robbery	Averell Harriman
Harry Stein	9 July 1955	Murder-Robbery	Averell Harriman
Nathan Wissner	9 July 1955	Murder-Robbery	Averell Harriman
Edward Nichols	8 September 1955	Murder-Robbery	Averell Harriman
Clarence Reed	8 September 1955	Murder-Robbery	Averell Harriman
William Byers	12 January 1956	Murder	Averell Harriman
Norman Roye	19 January 1956	Murder	Averell Harriman
John Francis Roche	27 January 1956	Murder-Rape-Robbery	Averell Harriman
Ernest Edwards	28 June 1956	Murder-Robbery	Averell Harriman
Frank Newman	23 August 1956	Murder	Averell Harriman
Joseph Reade	30 August 1956	Murder-Rape	Averell Harriman
Leonardo Salemi	28 February 1957	Murder	Averell Harriman
MacDonald Browne	14 March 1957	Murder	Averell Harriman
Miguel Santiago	15 August 1957	Murder	Averell Harriman
David Taylor	21 November 1957	Murder-Robbery	Averell Harriman
Elmer Burke	9 January 1958	Murder of Edward "Poochy" Walsh	Averell Harriman
Nicholas Dan Jr.	3 July 1958	Murder	Averell Harriman
Angelo LaMarca	7 August 1958	Kidnapping and murder of Peter Weinberger	Averell Harriman
Virgil Richardson	20 November 1958	Murder	Averell Harriman
Edward Eckwerth	22 May 1959	Murder	Nelson Rockefeller
Ralph Dawkins	16 July 1959	Murder-Robbery	Nelson Rockefeller
Jackson Turner Jr.	16 July 1959	Murder-Robbery	Nelson Rockefeller
Leroy Keith	23 July 1959	Murder-Robbery	Nelson Rockefeller
Ivory Mason	14 January 1960	Murder	Nelson Rockefeller
Pablo Vargas	12 May 1960	Murder-Rape	Nelson Rockefeller
Henry Flakes	19 May 1960	Murder of Joseph Friedman in a 1958 robbery	Nelson Rockefeller
Walter Green	19 May 1960	Murder	Nelson Rockefeller
Ronald Chapman	1 December 1960	Murder-Robbery	Nelson Rockefeller
Ralph Downs	5 January 1961	Murder	Nelson Rockefeller
Woodrow Miller	8 June 1961	Murder-Robbery	Nelson Rockefeller
Frederick Charles Wood	21 March 1963	Murder	Nelson Rockefeller
Eddie Lee Mays	15 August 1963	Murder of Maria Marini in a robbery. This was the last execution in New York prior to the death penalty being declared unconstitutional in New York.	Nelson Rockefeller

As a result of several United States Supreme Court decisions, capital punishment was suspended in the United States from 1972 through 1976.

Since 24 June 2004, the New York State death penalty statute has been declared unconstitutional by the New York Court of Appeals.

== See also ==
- Capital punishment in New York (state)
- Capital punishment in the United States
