= Peck Block =

- U.S. National Register of Historic Places
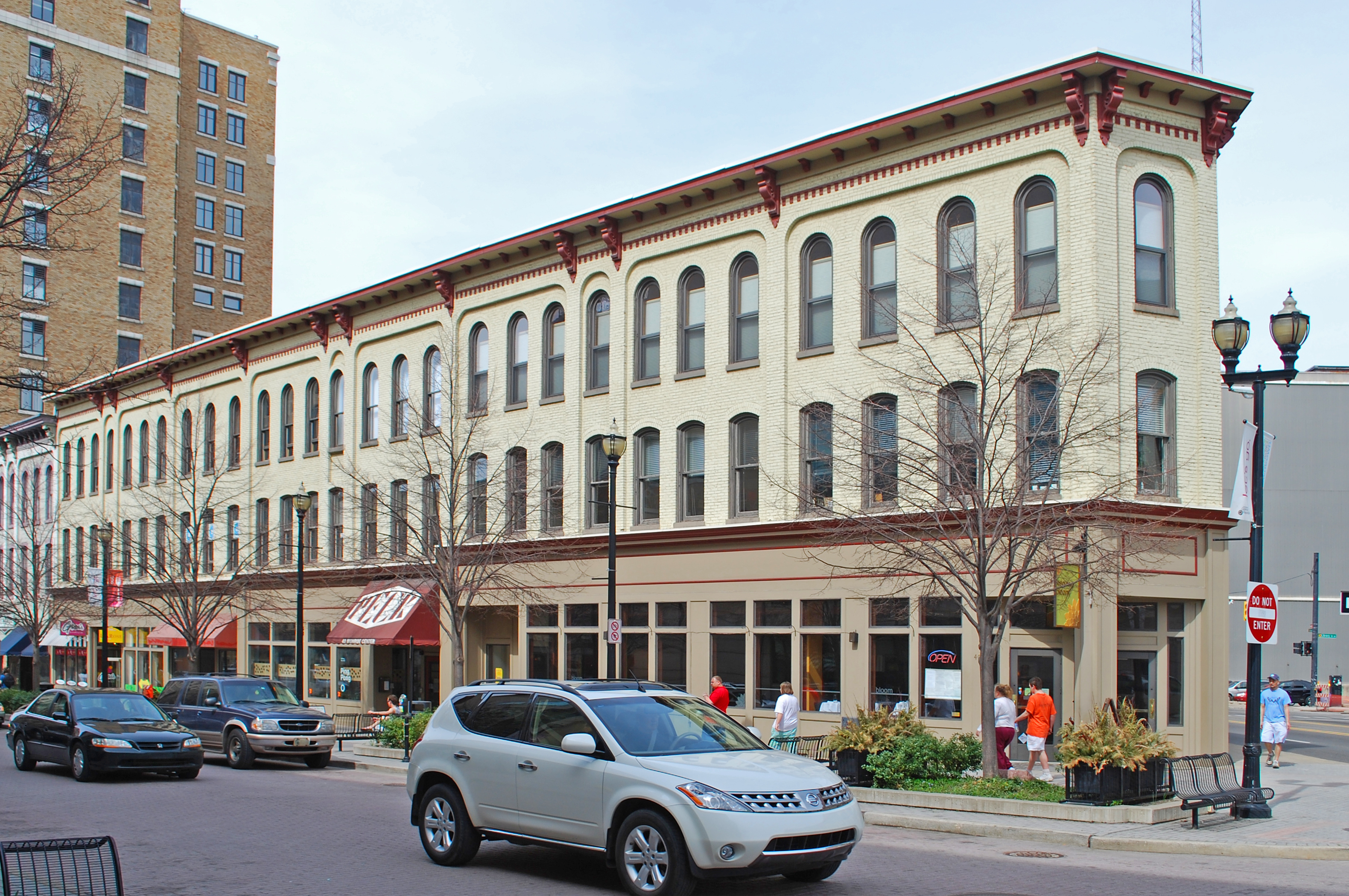

- Location within Michigan Location within the United States
- Interactive map
- Location: 34-50 Monroe Center NW, Grand Rapids, Michigan
- Coordinates: 42°57′51″N 85°40′07″W
- Area: Less than one acre
- Built: 1875
- Built by: Reuben Wheeler
- Architectural style: Italianate
- NRHP reference No.: 00001483
- Added to NRHP: December 7, 2000

The Peck Block is a commercial building located at 34-50 Monroe Center NW in Grand Rapids, Michigan. It was listed on the National Register of Historic Places in 2000. The building has been rehabilitated to house condos on the upper floors.

== History ==
Amos Rathbone came to Grand Rapids from Covington, Indiana in 1839, joining his brother Albert. He opened a general store in partnership with his nephew, and by 1843 was profitable enough to warrant constructing a new building, the city's first stone commercial structure. Rathbone diversified into other businesses, including mining gypsum and investing in the Grand Rapids and Indiana Railroad. In the early 1870s, Rathbone began developing brick commercial blocks along Monroe Street, demolishing the frame houses previously there and pushing the city's commercial core outward. Rathbone worked with builder Reuben Wheeler to construct these new commercial blocks. In 1875, Rathbone had this commercial building constructed. It was initially called the "Rathbone Block", but soon became known as the "Peck Block", named after the large Peck Brothers Drugstore which took up tenancy in the corner of the block. Peck Brothers was founded by Thomas and John Peck, and soon was worth several million dollars. John Peck was later a victim of a sensational New York murder in 1916.

Peck Drugs remained a tenant in the Block until 1968 when it was sold to Revco Drugs. Revco remained in the space until 1988. Amos Rathbone owned the Peck Block until his death in 1882, after which it, along with much of his estate, passed to Rathbone Trust. The Trust was established to manage his real estate interests for the benefit of his wife, Amanda, two nieces, and a nephew. The Peck Block remained in the hands of the Trust until 1992, when it was sold to the Kent County Council for Historic Preservation. The building was rehabilitated in 1999, and houses commercial space on the first floor and condos above.

== Description ==
The Peck Block is a three-story brick Italianate structure, composed of three separate buildings sharing a unified facade. The buildings fill an irregular lot, with the two westernmost buildings fronting on Monroe Center having a rectangular footprint and the third building filling the triangular-shaped corner of the lot. The facade along Monroe is eleven bays wide, with a single narrow bay over the entry at the Monroe and Division corner.. The bays are separated by brick piers running up the upper two stories from an intermediate cornice above the first floor. A bracketed metal cornice runs across the top of the building. The bays alternate wider bays with three windows per floor and narrower bays with one window per floor, which originally contained stairways leading to the upper floors. The windows are one-over-one, double-hung units, in segmental arches on the second floor and round arches on the third floor.
