= Roxana Druse =

Executed woman from New York (died 1887)

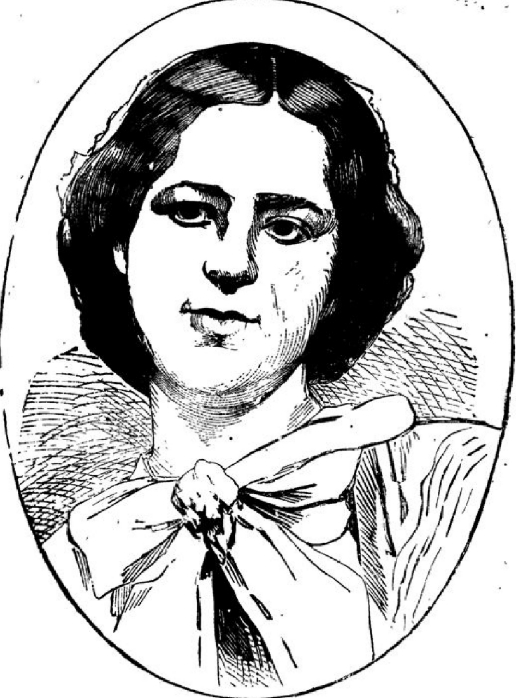
- Born: Roxalana Teftt c. 1847
- Died: February 28, 1887 (age 39-40); Herkimer County, New York, U.S.
- Other names: Roxalana Druce; Roxana Druce
- Spouse: William Druse
- Children: Mary and George Druse
- Status: Executed
- Motive: Spousal abuse
- Conviction: First degree murder
- Penalty: Death

Roxalana "Roxana" Druse (c. 1847 – February 28, 1887), was the last woman hanged in the state of New York, and the first woman hanged in 40 years in Central New York. Her botched execution didn't kill her instantly, further motivating New York officials to replace the gallows with the electric chair in New York in 1890.

Druse murdered her husband, William Druse, in their home in Warren, New York, by shooting him and decapitating him with an axe. Her son and daughter, George and Mary Druse, and nephew, Frank Gates, assisted her in the murder. Druse later said that she murdered him because of domestic violence. She was sentenced to be hanged on October 6, 1885, and was hanged on February 28, 1887.

== Background ==
William and Roxana Druse married in approximately 1864. The marriage bore two children: an older daughter named Mary, who was 19 at the time of William Druse's murder, and a younger son named George, who was 10 at the time of the murder. The family resided in a farmhouse in Warren, a small town in Herkimer County, New York, and they also lived with William's 14-year-old nephew, Frank Gates. William was 56 at the time of his death.

The Druse family dealt with debt and incurred a "poor reputation" in their area due to William's bad temper and his penchant for swearing and working on Sundays. Neighbors and the Druses' children knew William Druse to subject Roxana to domestic violence, on one occasion striking her with a horse whip and paying a neighbor $5 in hush money. Their daughter, Mary, recalled two occasions when William struck Roxana with a branch pulled from an apple tree. He also strangled Roxana and threatened to murder her with a pitchfork. Shortly before her trial for William's murder, Roxana was quoted as saying her husband was only a "decent man" on their wedding day and, "My advice is never to get married. I think it is a poor plan. [...] It is a dreadful step to take and it ought to have more consideration than people give it."

== Murder of William Druse ==
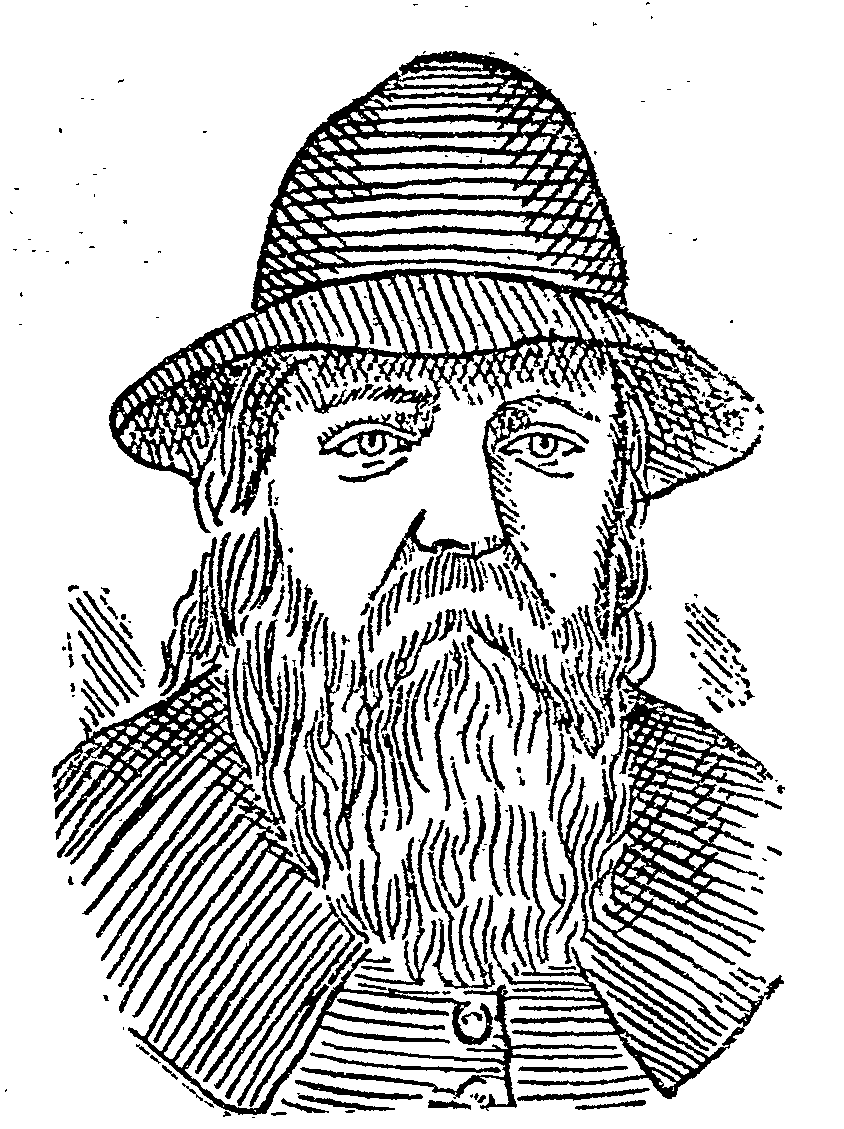
A drawing of William Druse, Roxana's husband

On December 18, 1884, William Druse became a missing person. According to Roxana, on the morning of the murder an argument broke out between the couple. During the dispute, Mary tied a rope around William's neck while he was sitting at the breakfast table, while Roxana shot him in the neck. She threatened Frank that if he did not also shoot William, she would kill Frank. Afterwards, William was decapitated by his wife with an axe. She dismembered and burned the rest of the body in the stove, and threw the ashes of William in a pond, as well as the revolver and axe.

Neighbors' suspicions were aroused when William did not resurface for several weeks. Roxana told neighbors William was gone because he was visiting New York City, but police sparked an official investigation into his disappearance, leading them to question Frank Gates on January 16, 1885. Gates confessed to participating in William's murder, implicating Roxana and Mary in the murder as well. During their investigation, police found human bone fragments in the ashes dumped by the pond, as well as the bloodstained axe used in the murder, and a bloodstained floorboard in the Druse farmhouse's kitchen.

== Trial ==
Mary Druse pleaded guilty to the charges against her and was sentenced to life imprisonment. She was sent to a penitentiary in Onondaga County, New York, to serve her sentence.

Roxana's trial lasted for two weeks in October 1885. During her trial and its aftermath, Roxana's case became a cause célèbre in the burgeoning first-wave feminist movement in the United States. Advocates for women's rights wrote in one petition, "Public policy requires that brutal men should be made to know that if their brutality recoils upon themselves the Law will not exact the last drop of blood from their defenseless victims. Those victims have no vote, no home, no refuge, no one on the bench or among the jury who can regard, nor even understand, the plea their sufferings make for them."

Roxana faced an all-male jury, who convicted her of first-degree murder on October 6, 1885, and passed a death sentence. Roxana was sentenced to be hanged on November 25, 1885, but later the date was pushed back to February 28, 1887.

== Hanging ==
Prior to her execution, New York Governor David B. Hill received letters from various states in the US demonstrating strong feelings towards Druse's sentence. Some requested that he commute Druse's sentence. Some of the letters questioned if it was ethical to hang a woman. The New York State Legislature introduced a bill to exempt women from the death penalty, but the bill was defeated in Assembly ten days prior to Druse's hanging. In one letter, a man offered to pay $10 to be able to personally execute Druse himself. Several letters were from citizens who volunteered to pay for the rope to be used in Druse's hanging, and some requested that the rope be taken on an exhibition tour throughout New York after Druse's hanging. Hill refused to intervene in Druse's sentence.

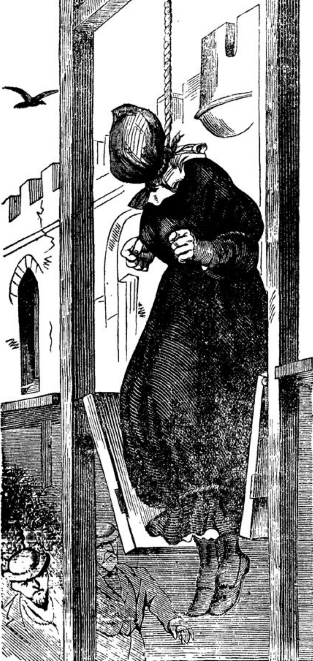
A drawing of Roxana's hanging

Roxana Druse was hanged on February 28, 1887, in Herkimer County. The gallows was concealed from the public, and there were only 25 official witnesses. Witnesses stated that Druse did not speak on the gallows, but she "moaned, cried, and finally shrieked so loud that her voice was heard in the jail and street" as her executioners concealed her face with a cap.

The hanging began at 11:48 am, and she was pronounced dead at 12:03 p.m. Druse's hanging was carried out with an upright jerker, which utilized a 213-pound (97 kg) counterweight that, upon being dropped, would hoist the condemned inmate into the air in the hopes that the force of the counterweight would break the condemned inmate's neck. Druse was lifted four feet (1.2 m) into the air, but the force of the counterweight failed to break her neck, and physicians said she instead died of strangulation.

=== Aftermath ===
Druse was the last woman hanged in New York State. Her hanging was one of several that motivated New York authorities to pursue a new execution method. Prior to Druse's hanging, officials had begun a commission to seek a more "humane and practical method" of execution in the state. In January 1888, less than a year after Druse's hanging, the commission recommended the new and never-before-used electric chair to replace hanging. New York's last hanging, of John Greenwall, took place on December 6, 1889. The electric chair was first used in the execution of William Kemmler on August 6, 1890, three years after Druse's execution.

Some doubt was later cast as to if Druse was actually the murderer, with Rev. John L. Sulden later saying, "I felt certain all the time that no woman with a face like this could ever be a murderess."

New York Governor Levi P. Morton pardoned Mary Druse in 1895.
