= Tom Howard (photographer) =

American photographer (1894–1961)

- Howard (center) wearing the camera he used to take the photo of Ruth Snyder's execution c. 1928
- Born: Thomas James Howard Jr. September 11, 1894; Chicago, Illinois, U.S.
- Died: October 8, 1961 (aged 67); Chicago, Illinois, U.S.
- Occupation: Photographer
- Spouse: Helen M. Walsh (m. 1929; died 1958)
- Children: 2
- Relatives: George Wendt (grandson); Jason Sudeikis (great-grandson)

Thomas James Howard Jr. (September 11, 1894 – October 8, 1961) was an American photographer who worked at the Washington bureau of P. & A. Photographs during the 1920s. His photograph of the execution of Ruth Snyder in the electric chair at Sing Sing Prison, on January 12, 1928, has been called "the most famous tabloid photo of the decade".

== The execution photo ==
As photographs are never allowed during executions in the United States, the New York Daily News, determined to secure a photograph, resorted to subterfuge. They brought in Howard, who was not known to the prison wardens or journalists in the New York City area. He arrived early and, gaining entry by posing as a writer, he took up a vantage position so as to be able to take pictures with the help of a miniature camera that he had strapped to his right ankle. The camera had a single photographic plate that was linked by cable to the shutter release concealed within his jacket. Because News editors had obtained blueprints of the execution chamber at Sing-Sing, they were able to calculate where Howard should be sitting in order to get the shot. When Snyder's body shook from the electricity, Howard pressed the shutter release, exposing the plate. The image appeared to have caught the subject in motion from the execution, which added to the already dramatic scene.

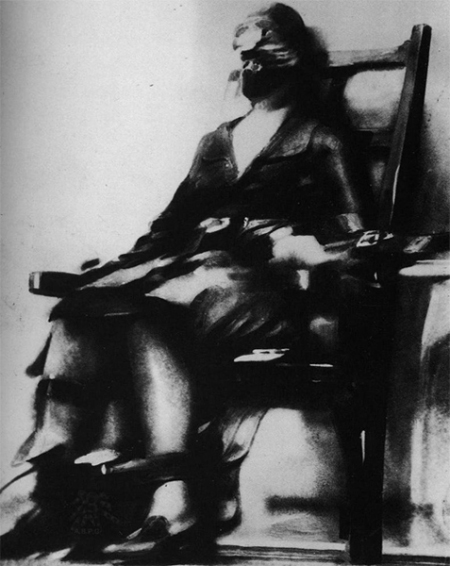
Tom Howard's photo of Ruth Snyder's execution, on January 12, 1928, was published the following day on the front page of the New York Daily News.

The photograph was published the next day on the front page of the paper under the banner headline "DEAD!"; Howard gained recognition for his work, and was handsomely paid for the image. Thereafter he worked in newspaper photography in Washington and Chicago, retiring as chief photographer for the Chicago Sun-Times in 1961, the year of his death. He had been in semi-retirement since 1951 following a heart attack.

The camera Howard used to snap the shot is part of the collection of the Smithsonian's National Museum of American History.

The state of New York attempted to prosecute Howard and the newspaper, but nothing ever came of it. For many years afterward, witnesses to executions were searched and asked to hold up their hands so they could not operate hidden cameras.

== Personal life ==
Howard's grandson was actor George Wendt, and his great-grandson is actor and comedian Jason Sudeikis. His wife, Helen, died in 1958.
