= Andreas Hall =

Executed American murderer and self-confessed serial killer

- Born: c. 1824; Petersburgh, New York, U.S.
- Died: March 15, 1849 (aged 24–25); Troy, New York, U.S.
- Cause of death: Execution by hanging
- Conviction: First degree murder
- Penalty: Death

Details
- Victims: 3 (2 convictions)
- Span of crimes: 1847–1848
- Country: United States
- State: New York
- Date apprehended: July 7, 1848

Andreas Hall (c. 1824 – March 15, 1849) was an American serial killer, burglar, and arsonist who was hanged in 1849 for the murders of a couple in Petersburgh, New York, the previous year. On the eve of his execution, he confessed to another murder committed a year prior, as well as numerous unsolved thefts, burglaries, and arsons committed around the area.

== Early life ==
Andreas Hall was born in Petersburgh, New York, in about 1824. According to his confession, he started drinking and stealing from a young age, the victims of these actions often being close relatives and friends. Allegedly, he was first thought of killing somebody at age 16, ostensibly to steal money but gave up on the idea for unknown reasons. Shortly after this, he repented from theft amid a religious reawakening and was said to have lived a moral life for the following two years.

When he reached adulthood, he relapsed and started committing robberies, with his homicidal tendencies growing ever stronger, but again, he never acted out on them. Hall claimed in his confession that he almost came close to killing a young man he had been quarreling with, but gave up on the idea.

== Murders ==
In 1847, Hall was traveling with another young man, Franklin Brown, when the pair got into some sort of quarrel near Troy. In his fit of anger, Hall killed him and then stole all valuables he had on him. In an attempt to hide the corpse, Hall left it in some brushlands and immediately left. Some time after the killing, racked with feelings of guilt and remorse, Hall contemplated suicide, only for his sister to interrupt and convince him not to do so. Not long after, Hall married and took on odd jobs as a laborer.

On July 1, 1848, Hall decided to burgle into the home of Noah and Amy Smith, both 75, an elderly couple who lived in an isolated farmhouse near Petersburgh, the latter being an aunt to New York State Representative Gideon Reynolds. Having previously done work for them, he was aware that the couple had around $1,500 (equivalent to $60,000 in 2025) worth of silver goods stashed in their home, prompting him to devise a scheme to kill them and steal it. After taking a wooden spike with him, he visited the Smiths at nighttime, ostensibly to inform Noah that his cattle had broken the fences behind his barn and fled into the meadows. The two men went to the area to inspect the situation, and upon arrival, Hall plunged the spike into the man's head, killing him instantly. Hall then returned to the house and asked for an axe, and after being given it and a glass of water, he proceeded to hack at Amy multiple times. As she was still alive at that point, he continued to strike her viciously, causing gashes on her neck that spanned from ear to ear. After stealing about $2,000 (equivalent to $70,000 in 2025) in cash and valuables, Hall fled the house and went to New York City, where he subsequently sold them.

The following day, concerned neighbors went to check in on the Smiths. After finding that the door had been locked, they broke it down, only to find Amy's body lying on a chair, covered in copious amounts of blood. Upon further inspection, Noah's body was also found in some grasslands near the barn. The crime was immediately reported to the authorities, who started a wide-scale search for the possible perpetrator(s).

== Arrest and trial ==
On July 7, 1848, Hall and an unnamed peddler of books and newspapers were arrested in Troy on charges of killing the Smith couple. While the peddler was later released, Hall was charged with Amy Smith's murder, to which he pleaded innocent. His subsequent two-week trial, followed alongside that of child killer Barney O'Donnell, was of great interest to the news media and locals. In the end, both men were found guilty and sentenced to death for their respective crimes.

== Execution ==
After maintaining that he was innocent for several weeks, Hall decided to come clean days prior to his execution and confess to numerous unsolved thefts, robberies, and arsons he had committed around Rensselaer County. Most shockingly, he admitted to the murder of Brown committed the year prior, for which he had never been suspected. Upon learning of this, Brown's father contacted Hall, who provided him with a diagram of where he had buried his son's remains. Mr. Brown and other residents of Troy then conducted a search party to find the remains, which were soon recovered.

On March 15, 1849, Hall and the aforementioned O'Donnell were publicly hanged in Troy. Their last words were reportedly final goodbyes to their friends and family.

== See also ==
- Capital punishment in New York (state)
- List of people executed in New York
- List of serial killers in the United States
