= Eva Coo =

American businesswoman and convicted murderer (d. 1935)

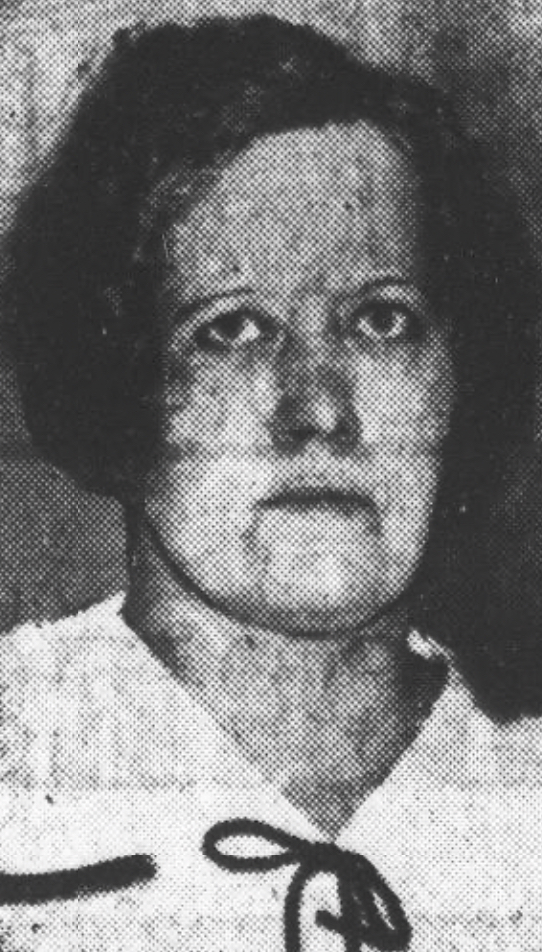
- Coo in a 1935 issue of The Washington Times
- Born: Eva Currie c. 1888 – c. 1892; Haliburton, Ontario, Canada
- Died: June 27, 1935 (aged 41–45); Sing Sing Correctional Facility, New York, U.S.
- Other name: Little Eva
- Occupations: Brothel keeper; innkeeper; speakeasy operator
- Years active: 1924–1934
- Status: Executed by electric chair
- Motive: Collection of life insurance policies
- Conviction: Murder in the first degree
- Penalty: Death

Details
- Target: Harry "Gimpy" Wright
- Weapons: Automobile; Wooden mallet

Eva Currie-Coo (b. c. 1888 – c. 1889; d. June 27, 1935), also known as "Little Eva", was an American brothel keeper, innkeeper, and speakeasy operator. Coo was convicted of murder in the first degree for the killing of her employee Harry "Gimpy" Wright so that she could collect on several life insurance policies that she had taken out on him. The investigation of Coo and her trial drew significant press coverage. She was executed by electric chair at Sing Sing Correctional Facility on June 27, 1935. She was the fifth woman to die in Sing Sing's electric chair.

== Early life and career ==
Eva Currie was born c. 1888 – c. 1889 in Haliburton, Ontario, Canada. She married a railroad worker named Bill Coo at the age of 18 and they divorced in 1920. By 1924, Coo had moved to Oneonta, New York, where she purchased an apartment building and opened a profitable speakeasy that catered to prominent individuals in Otsego County, New York. During her time in Oneonta, Coo was nicknamed "Little Eva" after the character in the novel Uncle Tom's Cabin. In 1928, Coo purchased a roadhouse in the town of Maryland, New York. She renovated the building and named it the Woodbine Inn; it also came to be known as "Little Eva's Place". Like her speakeasy, the inn was profitable and popular, being frequented by local politicians, businessmen, police officers, and rail workers for gin, gambling, and prostitution. By late 1929, with the start of the Great Depression, the Woodbine Inn began to lose its high-paying clientele and struggled to break even; Coo had trouble paying the mortgage and providing herself with a livable income.

== Killing of Harry Wright ==
In 1931, Coo allowed Harry Wright, a local, out-of-work, disabled alcoholic and frequent customer of the inn known as "Gimpy", to live in one of her rooms. In exchange, Wright cleaned and stocked the bar at the inn, took out the trash, and performed other odd jobs. Coo purchased several insurance policies on his life—allegedly ranging in value from $3,000 – $16,000 (equivalent to $72,000 – $385,000 in 2025) (Note: 1634–1699: McCusker, J. J. (1997). How Much Is That in Real Money? A Historical Price Index for Use as a Deflator of Money Values in the Economy of the United States: Addenda et Corrigenda (PDF). American Antiquarian Society. 1700–1799: McCusker, J. J. (1992). How Much Is That in Real Money? A Historical Price Index for Use as a Deflator of Money Values in the Economy of the United States (PDF). American Antiquarian Society. 1800–present: Federal Reserve Bank of Minneapolis. "Consumer Price Index (estimate) 1800–".)—of which she was the sole beneficiary. In 1933, Coo persuaded Wright to gift her the deed to his late mother's house. Coo was also named the sole beneficiary of Wright's will.

Wright's murder reportedly occurred as follows. On the afternoon of June 14, 1934, Coo asked Wright to go with her to Crumhorn Mountain—located in a rural area near the town of Maryland—to dig up cherry trees to plant on the inn's property. Coo brought along Martha Clift—a young, attractive employee at the inn and Coo's close friend. Once they arrived at an abandoned farmhouse, Coo went inside the building where she picked up a large wooden mallet, walked back, and struck Wright on the head. On the ground, Wright said "Now I know why you brought me here!" Clift then drove over Wright, crushing his chest, reversed, and drove over him again.

At that moment, the property owner, a Mrs. Fink, arrived to show the farmhouse for potential sale to a man named Ben Hunt, who brought his wife and their five children. Mrs. Hunt and Mrs. Fink, suspicious that Coo and Clift were there to steal Fink's property, walked over to the car—under which Wright's body was hidden—where they exchanged "sharp words" with the suspected trespassers for approximately 15 minutes. Eventually, Mrs. Fink believed Coo's explanation that they had stopped at her property so that Coo could "relieve" herself. Mrs. Fink and the Hunt family then left after Clift told them that Coo was "a very stubborn woman" and would only leave after they had. Fink filed a police report recounting her interactions with Coo and Clift.

After Mrs. Fink and the Hunts left, Coo and Clift wrapped Wright's body in a blanket, placed it in the back of the car, drove down the mountain, and dumped his body approximately 200 yards north of the inn on the road's shoulder. Coo called the police from the inn, stating that Wright had been missing that day and that she was concerned. In the morning of June 15, a New York State Police trooper found Wright's body. Coo told the police that she had been at the Woodbine all day on June 14.

== Investigation ==
The police initially believed that Wright had been drunk and was accidentally struck by a speeding car or truck. His death was thus ruled accidental, and he was buried on June 16, 1934. Coo later went to the Metropolitan Life Insurance office in Oneonta to collect on one of the life insurance policies on Wright, where she reportedly acted nervous and was shaking. The insurance agent called the funeral director, who told her that "Wright's body did not look like a typical car accident victim". The funeral director then contacted the coroner, prompting the police to reopen their investigation.

On June 18, realizing that Coo had lied about her alibi, the police asked her to attend a coroner's inquest regarding the death of Wright. Coo denied killing Wright and being on Mrs. Fink's property. Eventually, however, she claimed that Wright died after Clift accidentally ran into a ladder that he was on, killing him. During Coo's interrogation, the police searched her room at the Woodbine without a warrant, finding the life insurance policies on Wright. Coo continued to deny killing Wright. The police eventually found and arrested Clift, who on June 20 confessed and claimed that Coo had paid her to participate in the murder; she changed her story throughout the course of the investigation and trial. Coo then confessed, believing that she would not be charged with murder because Clift had killed Wright.

On June 20, the Otsego County Sheriff took Coo and Clift into custody. They were held in the county jail without formal charge and press were allowed in to interview them. On June 21, the police exhumed Wright's body. That evening, the sheriff and his deputies brought the body, Coo, and Clift to the farmhouse on Crumhorn Mountain, where they reenacted the crime on a stormy night, under the headlights of the sheriff and deputy's vehicles.

== Trial ==
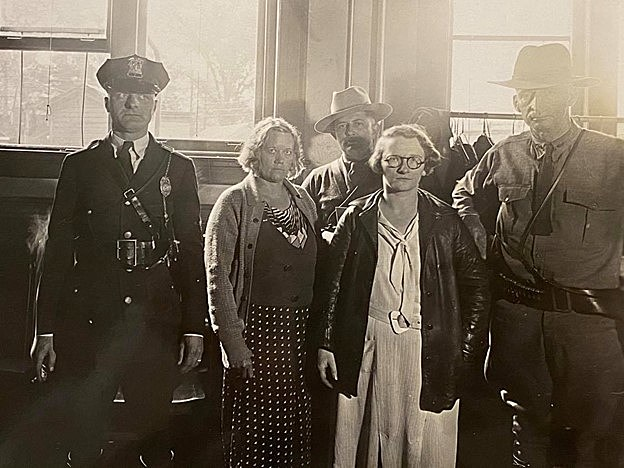
Coo, left, with her accomplice Martha Clift and three police officers, pictured in June 1934

Coo and Clift were charged with first degree murder, a capital offense, on June 25, 1934. They were indicted by a local grand jury in the evening of June 27. Jury selection began on August 6. During her walks into and out of the courthouse, Coo greeted onlookers, posed for photographs, and regularly addressed local men—supposedly customers—by their first names. Coo selected many of the jurors herself. Wright's body was again exhumed on August 11 at the request of Coo's defense counsel, who wanted it examined again for a cause of death.

The trial began on August 16 in Cooperstown, New York, with a jury composed of farmers. It drew significant media coverage from the local and New York City press as well as crowds of local spectators and tourists. Coo's case was compared to the case of Anna Antonio, a mother of three who was executed on August 9, as well as that of Ruth Snyder, who had been executed for murder in 1928. The scene around the courthouse "resembled a circus"; vendors "hawk[ed] ice cream and souvenirs, including mallets that resembled the one Eva had allegedly used on Harry Wright", and an underground market developed for the resale of courtroom tickets.

At trial, the prosecution called 74 witnesses, including Clift, who had agreed to plead guilty to second-degree murder in exchange for her testimony after losing immunity for lying. The court allowed Coo's first two confessions to the police into evidence over the objection of Coo's defense attorney, who claimed that the police had deprived Coo of sleep for 48 hours and tortured her by forcing her to reenact the crime.

On September 6, the jury convicted Coo of first-degree murder after two hours of deliberation, and the court sentenced her to death.

== Imprisonment and execution ==
Shortly after her trial, Coo was imprisoned at Sing Sing Correctional Facility and initially scheduled for execution in October 1934. Her execution was stayed pending appeal. In September 1934, the New York Mirror published a series of articles allegedly written by Coo, which purported to be her own life story. When she read the articles, Coo reportedly became "hysterical" because she worried she had been portrayed in such a negative light that it would harm her chances on appeal. Lewis Lawes, the warden of Sing Sing, investigated her complaint, and helped determine that her attorney had received $3,000 to bring John Kobler, a journalist posing as a stenographer, into the prison during interviews with her. The New York Court of Appeals affirmed Coo's conviction on April 30, 1935. She was executed on June 27, 1935, by electric chair. She refused her final meal, believing that the governor would commute her sentence. Her final words, to the prison matrons, were "Goodbye, darlings".

== See also ==
- List of people executed in New York
- Sing Sing § Notable inmates

== Sources ==
- Eggleston, Niles (1997). Eva Coo, Murderess. Utica, N.Y.: North Country Books. ISBN 0-925168-60-2. LCCN 97021464. OCLC 36949869.
- Gado, Mark (2008). Death Row Women: Murder, Justice, and the New York Press. Crime, media, and popular culture. Westport, Conn.: Praeger Publishers. ISBN 978-0-275-99361-0.
- Gillespie, L. Kay (2009). Executed Women of the 20th and 21st Centuries. Lanham, Md.: University Press of America. ISBN 978-0-7618-4567-6.
- Kilgallen, Dorothy (1967). "Hootch, Whores, and Homicide". Murder One. New York: Random House. pp. 111–150. LCCN 66022254. OCLC 2567300 – via Internet Archive.
- Krajicek, David J. (October 22, 2000). "Madam's Killer Greed". New York Daily News. p. 54 – via Newspapers.com.
- Shipman, Marlin (2002). "The Penalty Is Death": U.S. Newspaper Coverage of Women's Executions. Columbia, Mo.: University of Missouri Press. ISBN 978-0-8262-1386-0.
