= Rudolph August Witthaus =

American toxicologist (1846–1915)

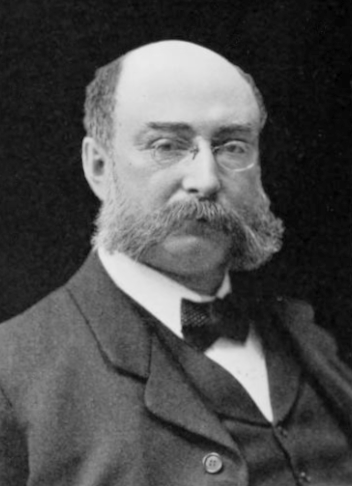
- Born: Rudolph August Witthaus Jr. August 30, 1846; New York City, U.S.
- Died: December 20, 1915 (aged 69); New York City, U.S.
- Occupations: professor, forensic toxicologist
- Known for: testifying in murder trials

Academic background
- Education: Columbia College, B.A. Columbia University, M.A. University Medical College at New York University. M.D.

Academic work
- Discipline: chemistry and toxicology
- Institutions: Cornell University University of Buffalo; University of Vermont University Medical College at New York University
- Notable works: Medical Jurisprudence, Forensic Medicine, and Toxicology

Rudolph August Witthaus Jr. (August 30, 1846 – December 20, 1915) was an American physician, chemist, and toxicologist. He was the top authority on poisons in the United States and was a forensic toxicologist in many important capital murder cases of the late 19th and early 20th centuries. He was also a survivor of the sinking of the SS Ville du Havre.

== Early life ==
Witthaus was born in New York City. He was the son of Marie A. Dunbar and Rudolph A. Witthaus, a physician.

He attended private prep schools in New York City. He graduated from Columbia College in 1867 with a Bachelor of Arts degree. While there, he was a member of the Fraternity of Delta Psi (St. Anthony Hall). He received an M.A. from Columbia University in 1870. He also studied in France at the Collége de France and the Sorbonne from 1873 to 1874. He attended the University Medical College at New York University and graduated with a Doctor of Medicine degree in 1875.

== Career ==
=== Academic ===
From 1876 to 1878, Witthaus was an associate professor of chemistry and physics at University Medical College. From 1878 and 1898, he was the chair and taught chemistry and toxicology at the University of Vermont. At Vermont, there was a scandal in July 1897 when 24 medical students were not graduating; most had failed Witthaus' chemistry exam.

He returned to University Medical College, where he was the department chair and taught physiological chemistry from 1882 to 1886. Next, he was the chair and a professor of chemistry and toxicology at the University of Buffalo from 1882 to 1888. While at Buffalo, he was also the City Chemist, working on creating clean water for Buffalo, New York.

He became chair and professor of chemistry and physics at the Cornell University Medical College from 1898 to 1911. In 1911, he was named professor emeritus at Cornell, serving in that capacity until his death.

=== Forensic toxicologist ===
Witthaus acted as a toxicological expert in several sensational poisoning cases, including the trials of Howard Benham, Martin Thorn, Dr. Robert W. Buchanan, Mary Fleming in 1896, Carlyle Harris, Roland Burnham Molineux in 1900, Albert T. Patrick in 1900, and Harry Thaw in 1907. His testimony sent many murderers to the electric chair in New York State. His bill for testifying in the Molineux case was $18,550.

== Professional affiliations ==
Witthaus was a fellow of the American Academy of Arts and Sciences. He was a member of the American Association for the Advancement of Science, the Chemical Society of Paris and the Chemical Society of Berlin. He was also a member of the Science Alliance.

== Publications ==
=== Books ===
- Chemistry of the Cobb-Bishop Poisoning. with Charles A. Doremus. New York, 1879
- Essentials of Chemistry: Inorganic And Organic, for the Use of Students In Medicine. New York: W. Wood and Co., 1879
- General Medical Chemistry for the Use of Practitioners of Medicine. New York: W. Wood & Company, 1881
- The Medical Student's Manual of Chemistry. New York: W. Wood & Company, 1883
- Laboratory Guide in Urinalysis and Toxicology New York: W. Wood & Company, 1886
- Organic analysis: A Manual of the Descriptive and Analytical Chemistry of Certain Carbon Compounds in Common Use. with A. B. Prescott. New York: D. Van Nostrand, 1887
- Essentials of Chemistry And Toxicology, for the Use of Students In Medicine. 2nd ed. New York: W. Wood & Company, 1888.
- The Principles of Chemistry. with Dmitry Ivanovich, George Kamensky, and A. J. Greenaway. New York: Longmans, Green and Co., 1891.
- Manual of Toxicology. 2nd edition. New York: William Wood and Company, 1911.
- Text-book of Chemistry Inorganic and Organic, with Toxicology; for Students of Medicine, Pharmacy, Dentistry and Biology, 7th edition, with R. J. E. Scott. New York: Wood and Co., 1919.

=== As editor and author ===
- Medical Jurisprudence, Forensic Medicine, and Toxicology, volume 1. with T. C. Becker editor. (1894)
- Medical Jurisprudence, Forensic Medicine, and Toxicology, volume 2. with T. C. Becker editor. (1894)
- Medical Jurisprudence, Forensic Medicine, and Toxicology, volume 3. with T. C. Becker editor. (1896)
- Medical Jurisprudence, Forensic Medicine, and Toxicology, volume 4. with T. C. Becker editor. (1896)

=== Journal articles ===
- "On Homicide by Morphine,"
- "The Detection of Quinine,"
- "On the Post-Mortem Imbibition of Poisons, and the Chemico-Legal Aspect of Embalming," Researches of the Loomis Laboratory. New York: Douglas Taylor (1890): 38–52.
- A Text-Book of Chemistry Intended for the Use of Pharmaceutical and Medical Students. Journal of the American Chemical Society, vol. 17, no. 8 (1895): 656–658.

== Personal life ==
=== SS Ville du Havre ===
In November 1873, Witthaus sailed to France aboard the steamship SS Ville du Havre. The ship collided with the iron clipper Loch Earn and sank in twelve minutes, killing more than 250 passengers. Awakened by the crash, he ran to the deck only to realize there were not enough lifeboats, noting two boats were already filled with French sailors, and forty men were fighting for the last boat. He used a sailor's knife to cut free several life preservers. He secured one life preserver to his body and jumped over the stern. Witthaus could not swim, but hung on to the life preserver. When he came to the surface, he saw the SS Ville du Havre sinking. He found a floating piece of pine wood and, along with two French sailors, clung to it for eight hours before being rescued. As Willhaus and other passengers were rescued from the open water, he was a voice a reason, challenging the captain's decision to move the female survivors from the rescue ship the Tri Mountain to the Loch Earn which had a large hole from the collision.

From the safety of Paris, Witthaus noted that all of the rescued passengers were saved from the open water, while twenty officers and crew—and no passengers—reached the safety of the Loch Earn in lifeboats. Of the survivors, Witthaus was the most outspoken, "declaring that the blame of the disaster rests entirely on the officer of the steamer in charge at the time of the collision."

=== Marriage ===
Witthaus married widow Bly Ella F. Ranney in 1882 in New York City. In 1896, the couple separated. Witthaus filed for a divorce absolute in December 1896, making numerous claims against his wife, including indicating that she had an illness which resulted in a loss of reason. She claimed she was beat and kicked by Witthaus.

In March 1898, Bly filed for a modification of a divorce decree in White Plains, New York. Kate Devino was named as a co-defendant in the divorce proceedings. However, Witthaus claimed there was a prior divorce ruling for abandonment, but that Bly had prevented the divorce absolute. Bly lost the case; the judge ruled she had filed for an amendment to increase her alimony, which was $2,000 a year.

In March 1901, Bly once again went to court, this time asking for their divorce decree to be vacated. This time, she claimed the original divorce had involved fraud and that Witthaus had caused her mental illness with poisons. She also claimed that her prior lawyer had been in collusion with her husband's attorney. She filed in Westchester County, New York with hopes of a quicker resolution and limited newspaper coverage. Witthaus's counsel responded that his client had sold real estate, splitting the proceeds with his ex-wife. However, Bly had taken and cashed Witthaus' insurance policies. In addition, her medications prescribed by her husband had been tested and were safe. At the time of this court case, Bly was living with another man at the Waldorf Astoria Hotel.

=== Clubs and collections ===
Witthaus had a collection of art, including tapestries, porcelain, and statues. He also owned a manuscript that included Izaak Walton's The Compleat Angler, works of Rudyard Kipling, and a many manuscripts by Robert Louis Stevenson.

He was a member of the American Yacht Club, the Lotos Club, the Reform Club, the St. Anthony Club of New York, and the University Club of New York. He was also a member of the American Museum of Natural History.

=== Death and will ===
In 1915, he died at his home at 2039 Broadway in New York City at the age of 69.

After his death, his brother Guy Witthaus, niece Emily Mommer, and nephew Fred E. Mommer contested his will, claiming Jennie Cowan, with whom he lived, had gotten him drunk at the Sherman Square Hotel before he wrote the will. In addition, his relatives claimed that Witthaus was "in his dotage" and had mental and memory impairments. Cowan inherited $20,000 in cash, property worth $31,712, stock and bonds worth $47,699, and a painting by Fagani. However, at the time Witthaus wrote his will, Cowan was also married and living with Robert Shore—without the knowledge of Witthaus. Her actual name was Jennie Shore.

Witthaus also made a bequest to the New York Academy of Medicine. His estate was appraised at $228,473 after it was discovered that many of his high-value art items were copies. However, the Robert Louis Stevenson manuscript collection was appraised at $31,461, and the Rudyard Kipling manuscript for $4,101.
