= Murder of Robert Ross =

- Date: March 6, 1894
- Weapon: Revolvers
- Deaths: Robert Ross (died shortly after the gunshot)
- Victims: William and Robert Ross
- Perpetrators: Bartholomew Shea and John McGough
- Motive: Ballot stuffing
- Convicted: July 4, 1894

In Troy, New York, on March 6, 1894 during an election riot between pollwatchers and Catholic working-class minority voters who were suspected to be engaging in ballot stuffing, a young poll watcher, Robert Ross, was shot and killed. His brother, William, was also shot but survived.

Bartholomew Shea and John McGough were at the polling booth of the third district of the Thirteenth Ward. William and Robert Ross were present as poll watchers. "The row started when one of the Shea gangs sought to vote upon another citizen's name and in a twinkling clubs and revolvers were flourished. Many shots were fired and when the fight closed it was found that Robert Ross had been fatally shot, that his brother, William, [sic] received a bullet in the neck and that Shea and McGough, who fled from the scene, had each been slightly wounded." Shea and McGough were caught and arrested, at which time McGough initially claimed he had fired the shot that killed Ross, but later apparently withdrew this claim, only to repeat the claim years later, after Shea's execution in 1896.

A New York Times report on the incident laid blame directly on former Troy Mayor Edward Murphy Jr., who had been elected to the United States Senate the previous year (he would serve one term), which included the following excerpt:

"The gun that shot Robert Ross has been loaded on election day in Troy ever since "Boss" Murphy's gang began their systematic frauds, a dozen years ago."

— New York Times

McGough and Shea were arrested and an original suspect in the shootings, John Boland, was released from custody. The trial of Shea and McGough began on May 28, 1894. On July 4, 1894, Shea was convicted of first degree murder and McGough was convicted of first degree assault. McGough was sentenced by 19.5 years imprisonment and Shea was sentenced to death. Several lengthy appeals and efforts to have Shea's sentence commuted failed and he was executed in 1896.

Troy's attorney Frank S. Black assisted in the prosecution of Shea and McGough. The favorable name recognition he garnered propelled his successful candidacies for a seat in the United States House of Representatives in 1894, and governor of New York in 1896.

== See also ==
- Capital punishment in New York
- List of people executed in New York
