= Carlyle Harris =

American convicted murderer

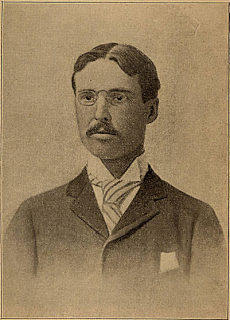
- Born: September 1868; Glens Falls, New York, U.S.
- Died: May 8, 1893 (age 24); Sing Sing Prison, New York, U.S.
- Occupation: Medical student
- Spouse: Mary Helen Potts
- Status: Executed by electrocution
- Conviction: First degree murder
- Penalty: Death

Carlyle Harris (September 1868 – May 8, 1893) was a medical student who was convicted and sentenced to death for the murder of his wife.

A student at New York College of Physicians and Surgeons, Harris murdered his wife, Mary Helen Potts, whom he had married on February 8, 1890, with an overdose of morphine in the form of sleeping pills. Although Potts' death was first attributed to a stroke, the murder was discovered by physicians only because she displayed severely contracted pupils, a characteristic symptom of morphine poisoning.

Prosecuted by Assistant District Attorney Charles E. Simms Jr., the witnesses against Harris included Dr. Rudolph Witthaus. Harris was represented by prominent defense attorney William F. Howe. He was found guilty of first degree murder, on February 8, 1892, the second anniversary of his marriage to Helen Potts and was executed in the electric chair at Sing Sing Prison on May 8, 1893.

== Legacy ==
The story "Max Hensig, Bacteriologist" was written by Algernon Blackwood who had been a police reporter for the New York Times during the murder trial.

Journalist and author Bernard Barshay wrote the story "The Case of the Six Capsules" based on the events of the trial. This story was later recorded on the record Four American Murder Mysteries.

== See also ==
- Capital punishment in New York (state)
- Capital punishment in the United States
- List of people executed in New York
