= Carl Feigenbaum =

German murderer, suspected serial killer, and Jack the Ripper suspect

- Born: Carl Ferdinand Feigenbaum; 1840; Karlsruhe (possibly), Grand Duchy of Baden
- Died: April 27, 1896 (aged 55–56); Sing Sing Prison, New York, U.S.
- Other name: Anton Zahn
- Status: Executed by electrocution
- Conviction: First degree murder
- Penalty: Death

Details
- Victims: 1–13+
- Span of crimes: (possibly) 1888 – 1894
- Country: United States (confirmed); Germany, Nicaragua, Switzerland (alleged)
- States: New York (confirmed); Schleswig-Holstein, Managua, Wisconsin, Bern, New Jersey, Berlin
- Date apprehended: August 31, 1894

Carl Ferdinand Feigenbaum, alias Anton Zahn (1840 – April 27, 1896), was a German merchant seaman, occasional florist and alleged serial killer executed at Sing Sing Prison in 1896. His crime was murdering his landlord, and contemporary hypotheses accuse him of being Jack the Ripper.

== Crime and punishment ==
The official history records only a single murder for this offender, which – due to its viciousness and gravity – was enough to sentence him to death.

The widow Juliana Hoffman was 65 years old on September 1, 1894, the date of her murder. At that time, she lived with her 16-year-old son in a precarious room located on East Sixth Street in New York City, on the second floor of an older building, on whose ground floor was a warehouse.

A very modest, second room reserved for tenants had been sublet to a 54-year-old German man. On Wednesday, August 29, 1894, this man had come to the house in response to an ad placed in the newspaper, where the room was offered for rent.

The individual with whom Juliana had just closed a deal had presented himself as a sailor with no current occupation. He gave the excuse that on the next day he would start work as a florist in a local store and that, thanks to the salary, could pay the agreed price, consisting of $1, plus 8 cents a day in exchange for breakfast.

Near 10:00 pm on Friday, August 31, 1894, Carl Feigenbaum quietly entered the room where Mrs. Hoffman slept and began stabbing her in the neck. He did not realize that her son was also sleeping there, and the boy began screaming for help. Police immediately came and arrested the killer.

The process lasted two years, but the proof was irrefutable. Condemned to death in the electric chair for the homicide, Feigenbaum was successfully electrocuted after suffering two intense discharges that were applied between 11:16 and 11:17 in the morning of Monday, April 27, 1896, in the Sing Sing Prison.

== Jack the Ripper ==
The first person to claim that Feigenbaum was Jack the Ripper was one of his two lawyers: William Sandford Lawton. Once his defendant had died, and Lawton was released from his vote of confidentiality, he declared to the American press his certainty that Feigenbaum and Jack the Ripper were the same person.

In recent times, the suspicion on this German sailor rebounded thanks to an extensive investigation by Trevor Marriott, which is condensed in the last three chapters of his book "Jack the Ripper: The 21st century investigation", originally published in the year 2005. This work reached an important circulation, and has been the subject of several reprints.

According to Marriott, the sailor could have landed in England thanks to being a crewman aboard the German merchant ship Reiher, which arrived in British ports near Whitechapel in the fall of 1888, precisely when the Ripper murders took place. As supplementary support for this hypothesis, the aforementioned British researcher refers to a series of deaths at different geographical points. Specifically, he proposes that it could be crimes committed by the Ripper, and that Feigenbaum, given the mobility that his nautical activity allowed him, could be found in all of these places at the time of the killings.

In his list of Feigenbaum's possible victims, Marriott points out a crime committed in July 1889 against a prostitute in Flensburg, Germany, where merchant ships arrived from the ports of Bremen and Hamburg, suggesting the sailor could have traveled in them and be subsequently present on the date of the murder.

It also includes the case of Laura Whittlesay (AKA Lottie Morgan), a prostitute killed with an axe on April 11, 1890, in Hurley, Wisconsin, US. And then, on September 4 of the same year in Bern, Switzerland, he recounts the slaughtering and subsequent mutilation of the body of a young peasant woman, who was the wife of a local tailor.

Later, on April 24, 1891, in Jersey City, New Jersey, US, he mentions the murder of Carrie Brown, a prostitute who was mutilated on the bed of a miserable hotel located in the southeast corner of Catherine Slip and Water Streets.

He also says that on October 25 of that year, in Berlin, Germany, a woman named Hedwig Nitsche was stabbed when she entered the hotel in which she lived, dying on the spot. The attacker was chased, but managed to escape.

The investigator also records that on January 31, 1892, a new murder was verified in New Jersey, US. The victim was a 73-year-old woman, Elizabeth Senior, who died in her home located near where Carrie Brown had been butchered the previous year. The lady's throat was sectioned and her body suffered several stabs. It seems that the killer showed great calm, because after the crime he washed his hands and proceeded to plunder the farm before leaving.

The culmination of this bloody trail was the violent death of Juliana Hoffman on August 31, 1894, in New York, where the perpetrator was no doubt Carl Feigenbaum.

None of the homicides listed above were ever solved, except that of Hoffman.

Regarding this list of deaths and the possibility that Feigenbaum was the cause of them, there are authors who emphasize that although the constancy of the veracity of these violent deaths is given only by press reports, and no police or judicial records remain, the case exposed became very suggestive and disturbing.

On the other hand, experts are inclined to not give any credit to the killings being caused by Feigenbaum, much less Jack the Ripper. It is emphasized that there were occasions where the victim was not murdered, but died a natural death, or was not a prostitute: for example, unlike what the press falsely reported, the case of the girl from Flensburg in July 1889. This generates skepticism and doubts about the list proposed by Marriott, also because the victims did not fit the profile of the Ripper's victims, being housewives, widows, peasants, as well as some patrons. Additionally, the weapons used did not conform to the modus operandi of the famous Whitechapel murders, given that the murderer(s) used knives, but also an axe or strangulation. Most of the deaths indicated therefore do not appear to be the work of Carl Feigenbaum, and some of them did not even occur, but were the invention of sensationalist newspapers.

Likewise, Marriott mentions an article in the New York Sun, dated February 6, 1889, which reported a series of Ripper-like murders in Managua, the capital of Nicaragua, in 1889. Specifically, according to that version, six prostitutes were killed and mutilated in the capital.

Curiously, three years before the book of the British researcher came to light, Nicaraguan writer and journalist Arquímedes González Torres published a novel that featured the Managua Ripper, perpetrating the crimes against the prostitutes there. The difference was that the Ripper was not embodied in that fiction by Feigenbaum, but by another suspect - Francis Tumblety.

However, even this possibility became the subject of criticism. In this regard, Wolf Vanderlinden pointed out that Trevor Marriott could not find any evidence about the existence of the alleged deaths in Managua, and that the newspaper that supported the information was later retracted, admitting to receiving false information.

== See also ==
- Jack the Ripper suspects
