= Ruth Snyder =

American murderer (1895–1928)

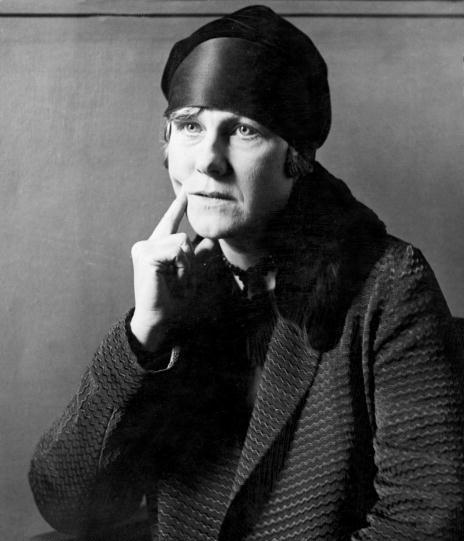
- Snyder, c. 1925–1928
- Born: May Ruth Brown; March 27, 1895; New York City, U.S.
- Died: January 12, 1928 (aged 32); Sing Sing Prison, New York, U.S.
- Resting place: Woodlawn Cemetery, Bronx, New York City, U.S.
- Occupation: Homemaker
- Spouse: Albert Edward Snyder (m. 1915; murdered 1927)
- Children: 1
- Status: Executed by electrocution
- Motive: Resentment
- Conviction: First degree murder
- Penalty: Death

Details
- Victims: Albert Edward Snyder, aged 44
- Date: March 20, 1927
- Locations: Queens, New York City, U.S.

May Ruth Snyder (née Brown; March 27, 1895 – January 12, 1928) was an American murderer. Her execution in the electric chair at New York's Sing Sing Prison in 1928 for the murder of her husband, Albert Snyder, was recorded in a highly publicized photograph.

== Murder of Albert Snyder ==
May Ruth Brown met Albert Edward Snyder (né Schneider) in 1915 in New York City, when she was 20 years old and he was a 33-year-old artist. The couple had little in common; Brown, who went by her middle name of Ruth to most people and was known as "Tommy" to close friends, was described as vivacious and gregarious, while Snyder was described as quiet and reserved and very much a "homebody". Despite their differences in personalities and age, the couple married and settled in a modest house in Queens. In 1918, Ruth gave birth to their only child, a daughter named Lorraine. Albert Snyder was employed as an art editor for Motor Boating magazine, published for most of its run by William Randolph Hearst, and earned $100 per week.

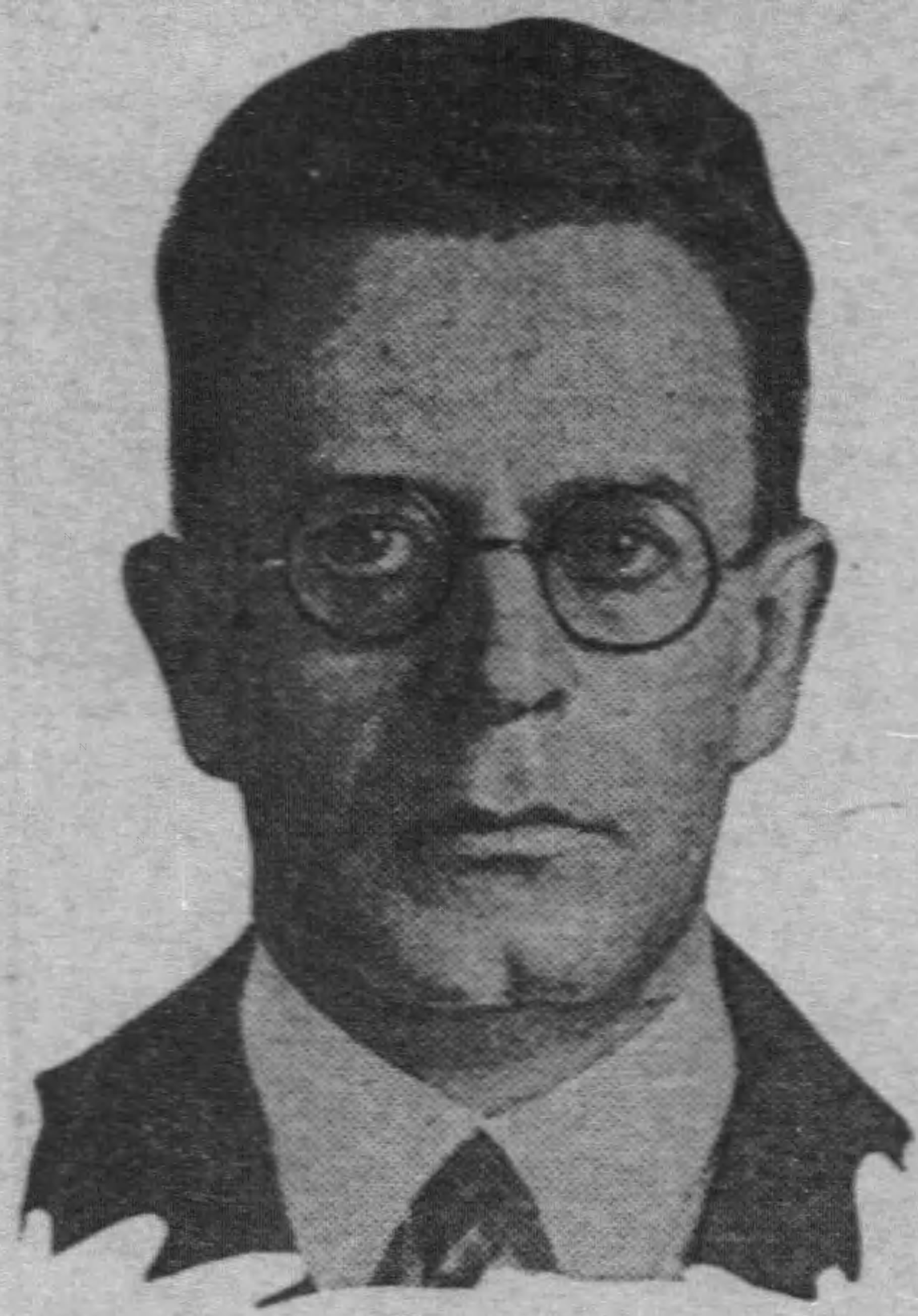
Judd Gray, the man with whom Snyder had an affair

In 1925, Ruth began an extramarital relationship with Henry Judd Gray (who, like Ruth, also went by his middle name), a married corset salesman who lived in the New Jersey suburbs. Ruth began planning the murder of her husband Albert, enlisting Gray's help, but he was reluctant. Ruth's disdain for her husband apparently began when he insisted on hanging a portrait of his late fiancée Jessie Guischard on the wall of their first home and had named his boat after her. Guischard had died ten years earlier and Albert described her to his wife as "the finest woman I have ever met". However, others have noted that Albert Snyder was emotionally and physically abusive, blaming Ruth for the birth of a daughter rather than a son, demanding a perfectly maintained home and physically assaulting both her and their daughter Lorraine when his demands were not met.

Ruth first persuaded Albert to purchase insurance, and with the assistance of an insurance agent (who was subsequently fired and sent to prison for forgery), "signed" a $48,000 life insurance policy with a double indemnity clause, paying extra if an unexpected act of violence killed the victim. According to Gray, Ruth had made at least seven attempts to kill Albert, all of which he survived. On March 20, 1927, the couple strangled Albert with a picture wire, stuffed his nose full of chloroform-soaked rags, and beat him with a sash weight, then staged his death as part of a burglary. Detectives who investigated the crime noted that there was little evidence that a burglar had actually broken into the house. Moreover, Ruth's behavior was inconsistent with her story of a terrorized wife witnessing the violent murder of her husband.

Mug shot for her transfer to Sing Sing Prison in 1927

Detectives discovered that the property Ruth had claimed had been stolen in the burglary had been hidden in the house. The real breakthrough came when a detective found a paper with the initials J.G. on it (it was a memento Albert had kept from Guischard). When asked by Detectives who "J.G" was, Ruth became flustered and instantly thought of Gray, whose initials were also J.G. She asked the detective what Gray had to do with the murder; it was the first time Gray had ever been mentioned, and the police immediately became suspicious. Gray was found in Syracuse, New York. He claimed he had been there all night, but it was determined that a friend of Gray's had obtained a hotel room in Gray's name to support his alibi. Under interrogation, Gray proved far more forthcoming than Ruth about his actions. He was arrested and returned to Queens. Both Gray and Ruth were charged with Albert's murder.

=== Trial ===
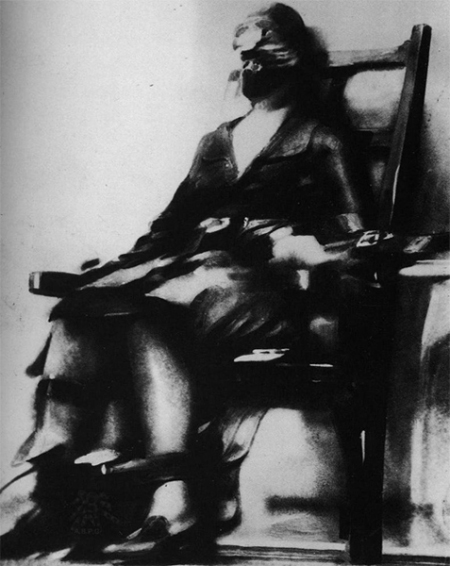
Ruth Snyder's mid-execution photo taken by Tom Howard and published the next day in the New York Daily News

Ruth and Gray turned on each other, contending the other was responsible for killing Albert; both were convicted and sentenced to death.

=== Execution ===
Ruth was imprisoned at Sing Sing in Ossining, New York. On January 12, 1928, she became the first woman to be executed at Sing Sing since Martha Place in 1899 and the third woman to be executed in New York. Ruth went to the electric chair 10 minutes before Judd Gray, her former lover. Her execution was surreptitiously photographed at the moment electricity was running through her body with the aid of a miniature plate camera strapped to the ankle of Tom Howard, a Chicago Tribune photographer working in cooperation with the Tribune-owned New York Daily News.

Both Snyder and Gray were electrocuted by Robert G. Elliott, the New York State Electrician; Snyder was the first woman he executed. In his autobiography, Elliott recalled that Ruth Snyder almost fainted when she saw the electric chair and that she had to be seated with the help of the matrons who had taken care of her while on death row. About the published photo of Snyder's execution, Elliott remarked that if such photos were routinely printed in newspapers, they either could have served as a deterrent against crime or have persuaded the public that capital punishment had to be abolished.

Ruth was interred in the Woodlawn Cemetery in the Bronx. Gray was interred in Rosedale Cemetery in Montclair, New Jersey.

== Lorraine Snyder ==
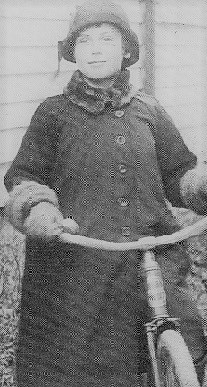
Lorraine Snyder

Following the pronouncement of the death sentence on Ruth Snyder in May 1927, legal disputes arose between the relatives regarding the care of Ruth and Albert's daughter, Lorraine, who was nine years old at the time. Warren Schneider, brother of Albert, petitioned to be allowed to appoint a legal guardian who was not a member of Ruth's family. Josephine Brown, Ruth's mother, also petitioned for custody of the girl. Lorraine had been in the care of Brown since the murder, and on September 7, 1927, Brown was awarded guardianship of the girl. Brown placed Lorraine in a Catholic institution a few months before the execution, and she was living there at the time of her mother's execution.

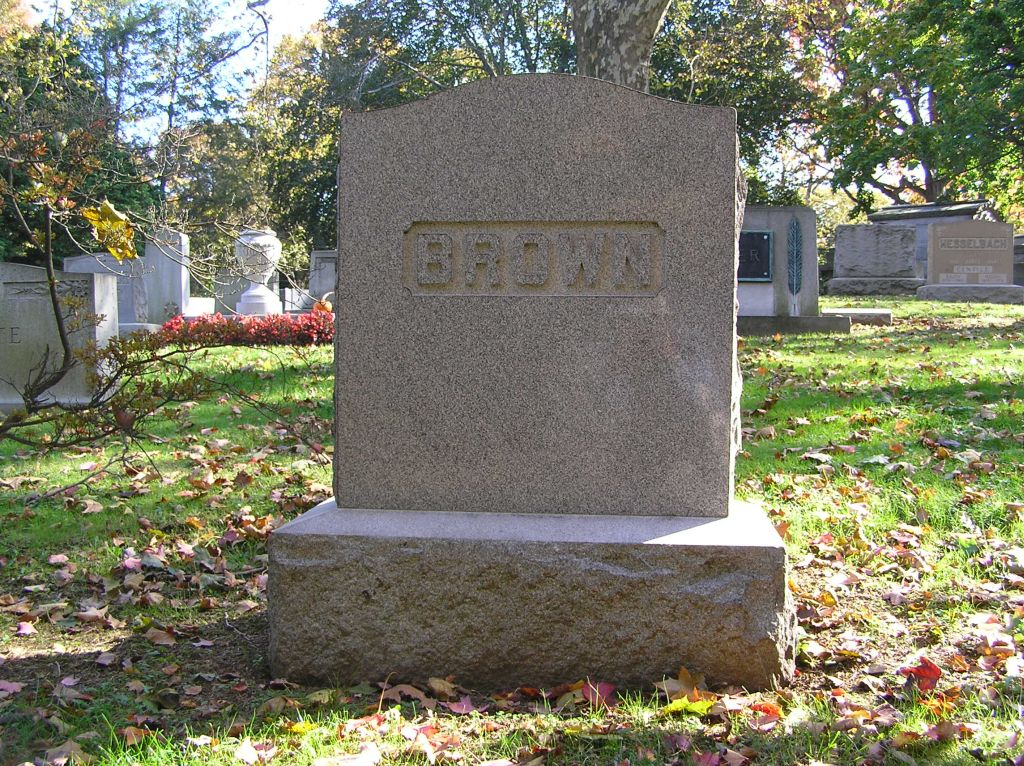
The grave of Ruth Brown Snyder in Woodlawn Cemetery

While incarcerated on death row, Ruth Snyder wrote a sealed letter that she requested be given to Lorraine "when she is old enough to understand". Ruth requested that her daughter not be brought to the prison for a final visit. One year after her mother's execution, Lorraine was apparently aware that her parents were both dead, but not of the manner of either of their deaths.

During this time, there were disputes with the insurance company Ruth had used to insure her husband's life. Although one policy, worth US$30,000, to Gray's daughter, was paid without contest, it filed suit to void two other policies, worth $45,000 and $5,000 (the three combined policies worth $1.48 million in 2025). By May 1928, the insurance company made available $4,000 for the maintenance of Lorraine. In November 1928 a ruling in the case was reached, with a court finding the policies could not be collected because they had been issued fraudulently. At the time of the judgment, the lawyer acting on behalf of Ruth's family asked the court to allow them to appeal without a printed record on the basis that the family was destitute and unable to sell the house due to the notoriety of the case. By May 1930, it was ruled on appeal that the two policies were invalid.

== In popular culture ==
Snyder inspired two notable villains in film and literature: Phyllis Dietrichson, the main antagonist of the novel and film Double Indemnity; and "the Incomparable Bessie Denker", an unseen character in the novel and film The Bad Seed.

The executions of Ruth Snyder and Judd Gray also play a small part in The Thing from Another World (1951). Reporter Ned "Scotty" Scott mentions that Snyder's was the first execution he had ever covered, and alludes to another reporter having snuck in a camera to take the famous photograph.

== See also ==
- Capital punishment in New York (state)
- Capital punishment in the United States
- List of people executed in the United States in 1928
- Eva Coo

== Bibliography ==
- Bryson, Bill. (2013). One Summer: America, 1927. New York: Doubleday. ISBN 0-767-91940-8.
- MacKellar, Landis. (2006). The "Double Indemnity" Murder: Ruth Snyder, Judd Gray, & New York's Crime of the Century. Syracuse, NY: Syracuse University Press. ISBN 0-8156-0824-1.
- Ramey, Jessie: "The Bloody Blonde and the Marble Woman: Gender and Power in the Case of Ruth Snyder", in: Journal of Social History Vol. 37, No. 3 (Spring, 2004), pp. 625–650
- Karl W .Schweizer, Seeds of Evil (Author House, 2001)Novelized account based on rare court records and documents.
