= John Greenwall =

Last person executed by hanging in the U.S. state of New York

John Greenwall, also known as Johann Theodore Wild (1859 – December 6, 1889) was a German immigrant to New York City who became the last person to be hanged in New York State. He was hanged at Raymond Street Jail for shooting Lyman Smith Weeks dead during a burglary on March 15, 1887.

A reward from the Mayor of Brooklyn was posted at $2,500, and Greenwall was arrested on April 5 along with several associates. Two trials in 1888 sought to disentangle the conflicting accounts of Greenwalls associates, while his lawyer argued that hanging was not a suitable punishment given that the electric chair was not the preferred method of execution, and the electric chair was not suitable given that the corresponding legislation had not been in place when the murder occurred. Greenwall was sentenced on December 5, 1889. "This information was at once conveyed to Greenwall, who received it without emotion. He had slept very little on Wednesday night, occupying most of his time playing checkers and penuchle with one of his keepers. He finally fell asleep about 3 a.m., but awoke with a start about 8 o'clock. 'I shall sleep no more', he said then. 'I've only one day left, and after that I'll sleep enough'" reported the New York Times.

The report continued that: "The condemned man had retained his unnatural calm until a second before the black cap was drawn over his eyes. Then his face grew suddenly white and his pinioned knees trembled. Father O'Hara quickly placed a crucifix on Greenwall's lips, and the latter kissed it passionately. The next instant "Joe" Atkinson had rapped sharply on the wooden partition concealing the 552 pounds of weights, a crash was heard, and Greenwall's body was jerked into the air."

William Kemmler, the first to be executed in the electric chair, was killed in 1890, ending the use of the hangman's noose in New York State.

== See also ==
- Capital punishment in New York (state)
- Capital punishment in the United States
- List of people executed in New York
