= Murder of Hannah and John E. Peck =

1916 arsenic poisonings in the United States

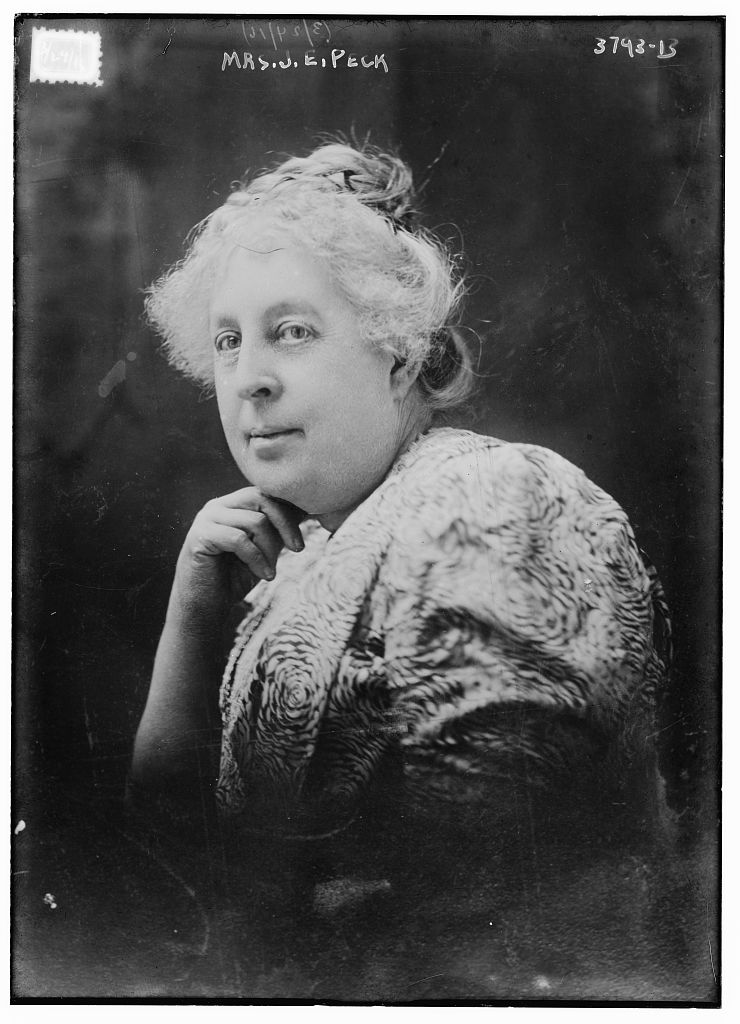
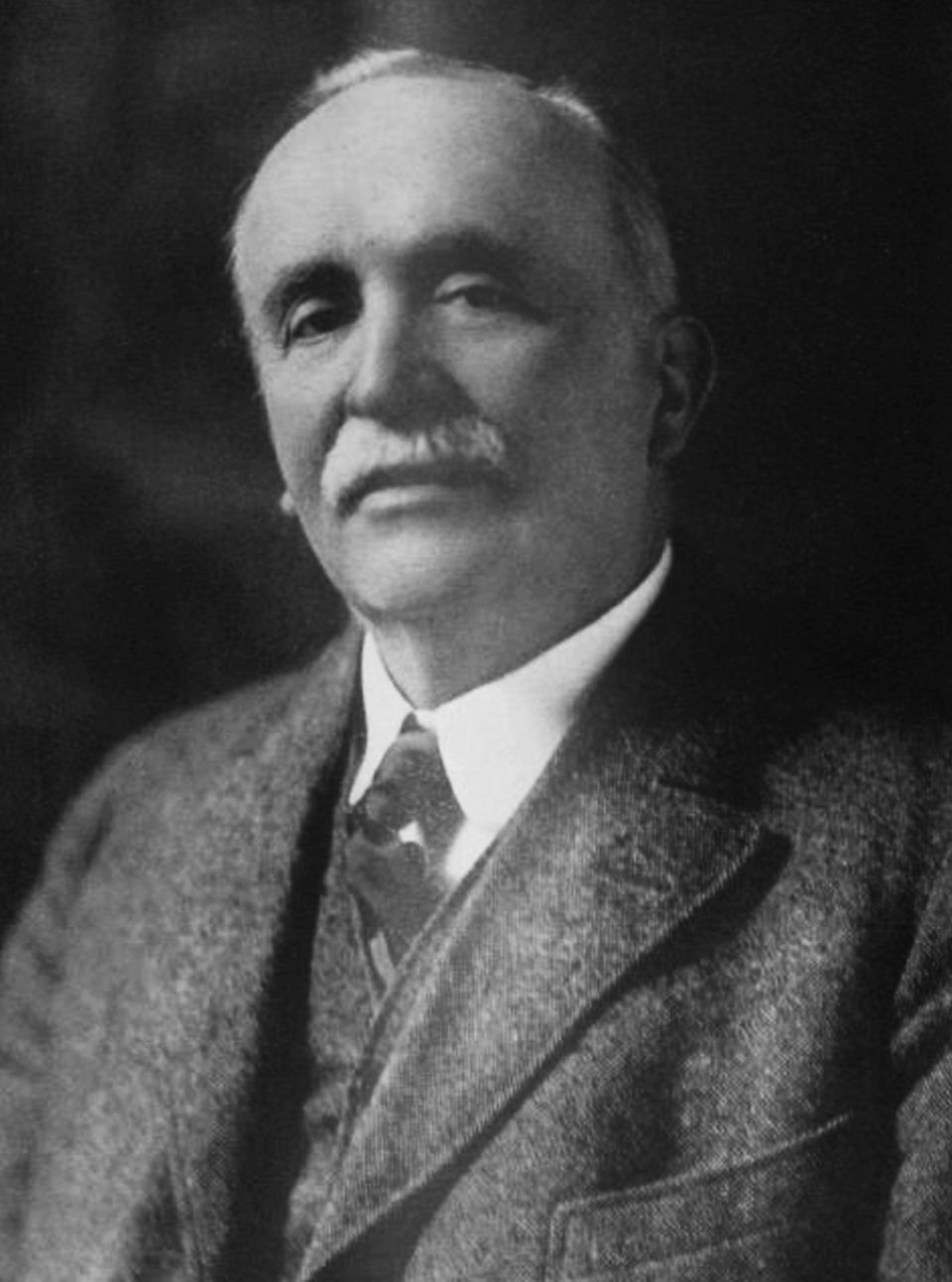
Hannah M. Carpenter Peck (left), and John E. Peck (right) were murdered by their son-in-law
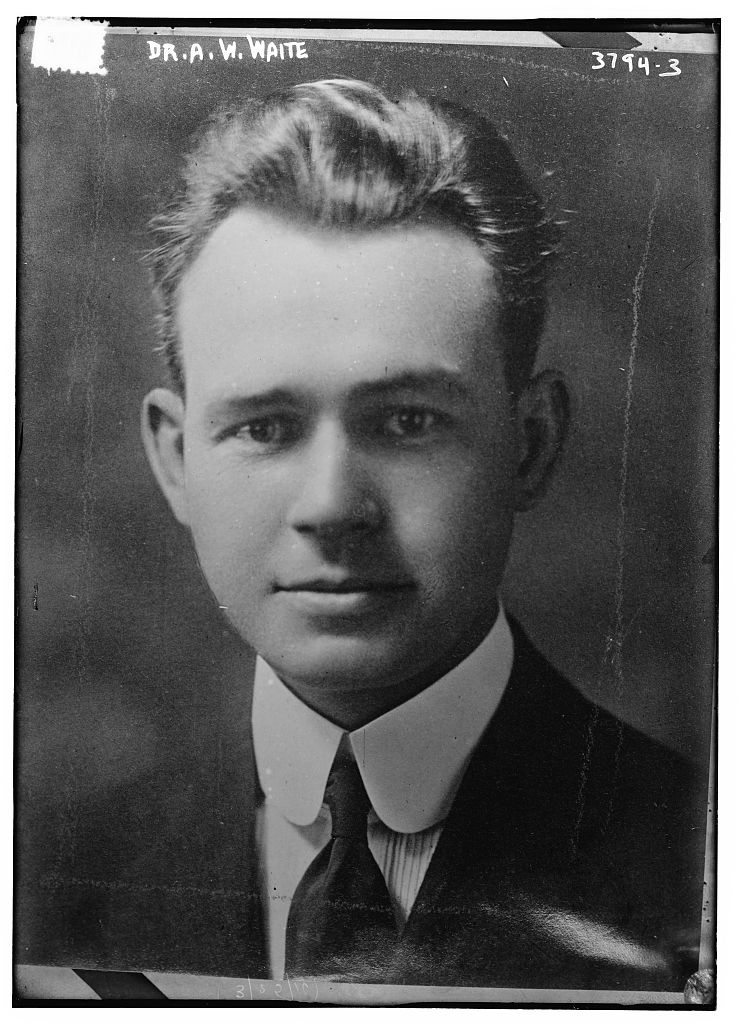
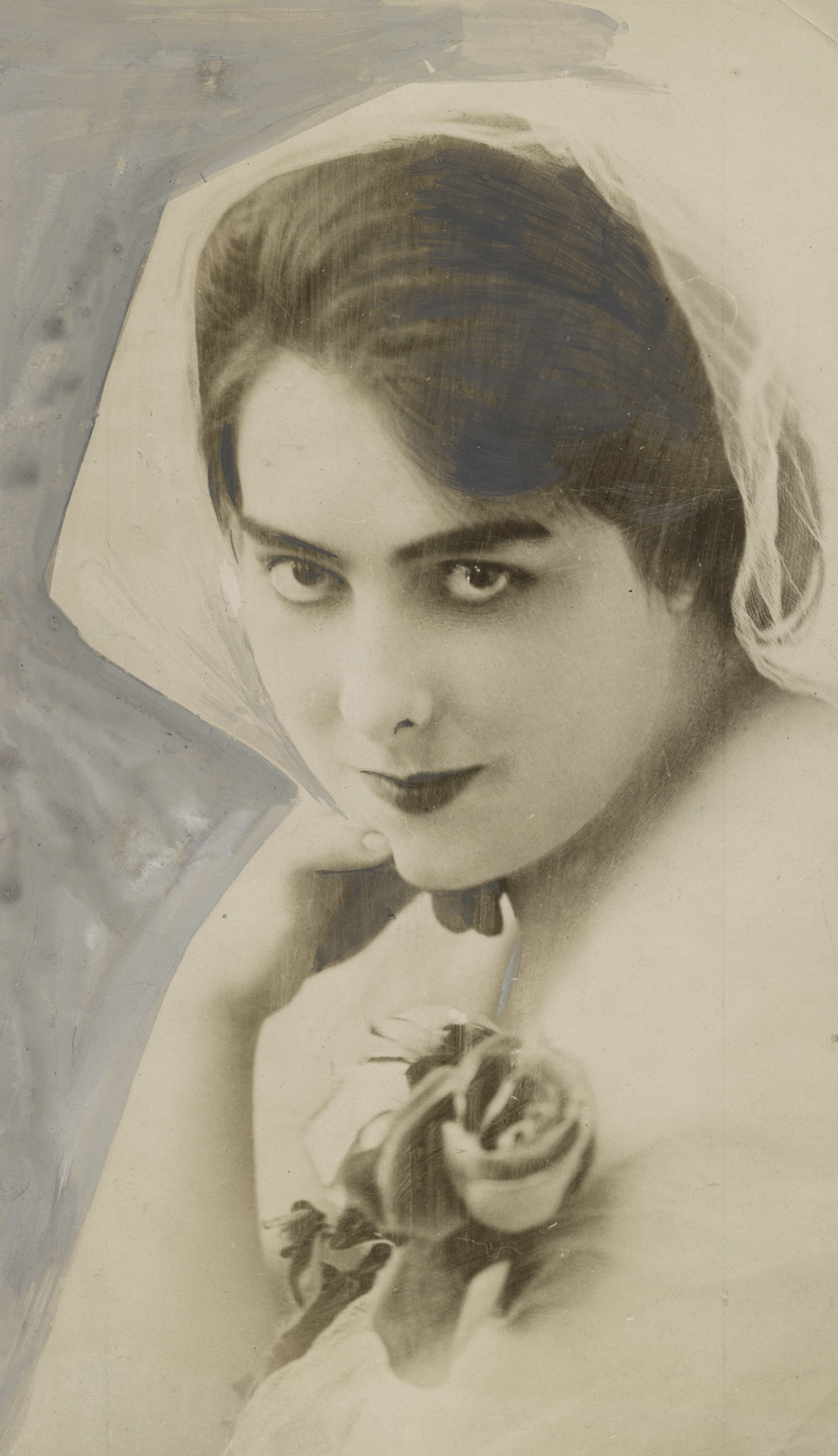
Arthur Warren Waite, the murderer (left), was having an affair with Margaret Horton (right)

Hannah and John Edward Peck were an American married couple that were poisoned with arsenic by their son-in-law Arthur Warren Waite in 1916.

== The murders ==
Arthur Warren Waite married Clara Louise Peck, the daughter of Hannah M. Peck (née Carpenter) and John Edward Peck on September 9, 1915, in Grand Rapids, Michigan. Hannah Peck was poisoned with arsenic and died on January 30, 1916, at the home of Waite and his wife, the victim's daughter, Clara Peck. John Peck travelled from Grand Rapids, Michigan to Manhattan, New York City and he died on March 21, 1916. Waite poisoned him during a dental exam and gave him additional arsenic in his food. When the death was too slow he gave him ether and smothered him with a pillow.

Waite was found guilty and sentenced to death via electrocution at Sing Sing on May 24, 1917.

== Perpetrator ==
- Arthur Warren Waite (December 2, 1887 – May 24, 1917) was born in Grand Rapids, Michigan to Warren W. Wait and Sarah Jane Haines. He claimed to be a physician and took a course in dentistry at the University of Michigan and then studied at the University of Glasgow. Subsequently, despite the fact that he was listed in directories as "Dr. Waite", he was neither a registered physician nor dentist.

== Victims ==
- John Edward Peck (March 4, 1844 – March 21, 1916) was born in Newburg, New York, to Elias Peck and Catherine Millard. He married Hannah M. Carpenter in 1876. He died at 435 Riverside Drive in Manhattan, New York City at the home of Arthur. He founded Peck Brothers Drug Co. with his brother Thomas M. Peck and sold it for several million dollars. He was a director of several banks and held stocks in furniture companies.
- Hannah M. Carpenter Peck (née Carpenter) (April 24, 1854 – January 30, 1916) was born in New York City. She married John Edward Peck and was poisoned by Arthur Warren Waite.

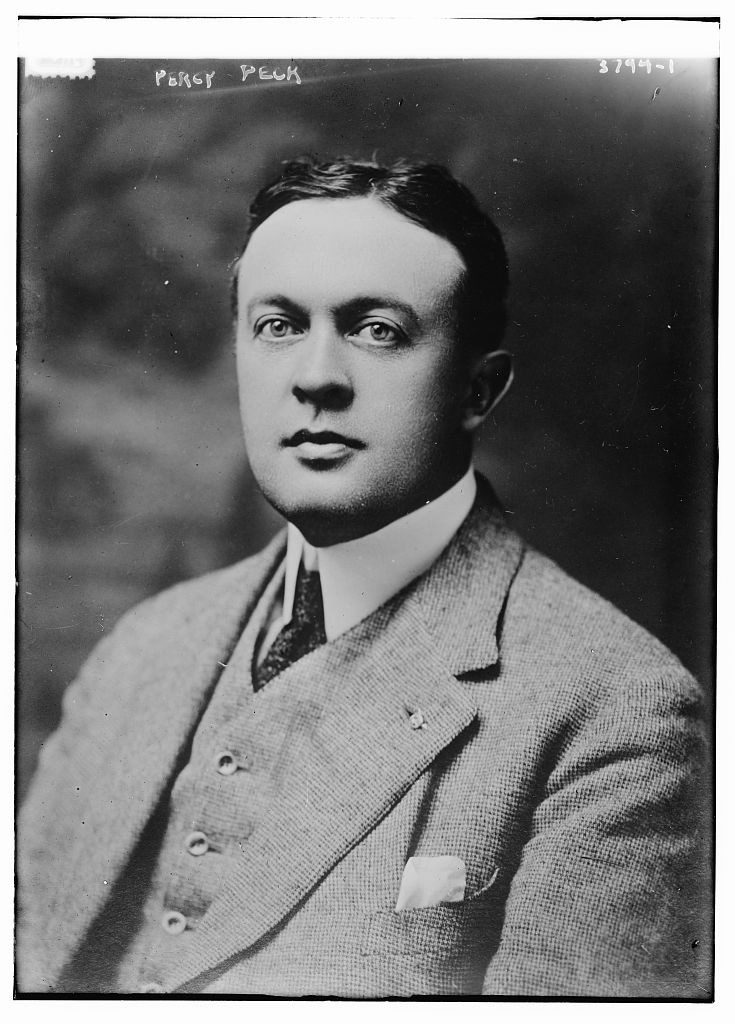
Percy Peck, the son of Hannah and John Edward Peck

== Family of victims ==
- Percy Seaman Peck (1878–1974) was the son of Hannah and John Edward Peck. He testified at the murder trial of Arthur Warren Waite.
- Clara Louise Peck Waite (1887–1964) was the daughter of Hannah and John Edward Peck and the wife of Arthur Warren Waite. She was poisoned and became ill but recovered. She later married John J. Caulfield (1883–1952).

== Margaret Horton ==
- Margaret Horton was a cabaret singer who was having an affair with the married Arthur Warren Waite.
