= State electrician =

Title given to executioners

The official title of "state electrician" was given to some American state executioners in states using the electric chair during the early 20th century, including the New York State electrician. The title itself is something of a euphemism, while the persons appointed were electricians by trade, the title on its own did not give any indication as to the true responsibilities of the position.

Hangings had usually been carried out by untrained county sheriffs, but when electrocution was introduced in New York, the first in the world ever to adopt it, it was felt that a trained electrician should be hired to operate the chair. Edwin Davis was New York's first state electrician. He carried out the execution of William Kemmler, the first man executed with the electric chair, and that of Martha M. Place, the first woman to be legally electrocuted. Davis also held patents on certain features of the electric chair and trained two of his successors, Robert G. Elliott and John Hulbert, who served as his assistants during executions.

In New York, state electricians were not full-time employees, but they were hired specifically for each execution or set of executions. Since Sing Sing became the only prison in the state to house a death row and execution chamber, about a week before an electrocution was scheduled to be carried out, the warden would send a letter to the state electrician to notify him. The executioner would report in a few hours before the execution in order to test his equipment. He would also usually be the one securing the head electrode in place while prison guards adjusted the straps and placed the leg electrode on the prisoner's calf. State electrician Robert G. Elliott, who executed nearly 400 inmates in six states, including New York, developed an electrocution technique that came to be known as the "Elliott method" and was subsequently used by all of his successors in Sing Sing. After an execution, the state electrician was required to fill in a form containing the name and number of the executed prisoner, the time at which he had entered the chamber, the time at which he or she was brought out of it and the number of amperes administered to him or her. Some of this executioner's report cards still exist, and one was published by Scott Christianson in his book about the death house in Sing Sing.

== State electricians by state ==
In brackets is the time period during which each state electrician, when his name is known, actively performed executions.

=== New York ===
- Edwin Davis (1890–1914). Davis was New York's first state electrician and carried out the first electrocution in the world, that of William Kemmler.
- John Hulbert (1914–1926)
- Robert Green Elliott (1926–1939)
- Joseph Francel (1939–1953)
- Dow Hover (1953–1963)

=== Ohio ===
- State law in Ohio, which was the second state to adopt the electric chair as a method of execution, required the warden at the Ohio Penitentiary to throw the switch at electrocutions.

=== Oklahoma ===
- Rich Owens (1918–1947)

=== Florida ===
- Until 1941, the sheriff of the county in which the condemned was convicted had to throw the switch at electrocutions. In 1941, a new law was passed requiring a specifically hired executioner that wore a hood to conceal his identity. After 1976, civilians could apply for the post, and the Florida State Prison warden kept a secret list from which he would draw a name each time an executioner was needed. No name was ever disclosed, and the selected executioner, who was paid $150, would be escorted to and from the prison. It has been speculated that the 1989 electrocution of Ted Bundy was carried out by a woman, but nothing exists to support the claim.

=== Massachusetts ===
- Edwin B. Currier (1910s). He was trained by Edwin Davis in New York and carried out at least one execution there in Davis's absence. He was also hired to perform Nebraska's first two electrocutions in 1920. John Hurlburt, who was New York State electrician at the time, had originally been offered the job, but fled Nebraska upon learning that some locals who were against capital punishment were planning to lynch him.

=== Mississippi ===
- Jimmy Thompson (1940–1950). He operated the state's portable electric chair.

=== Pennsylvania ===
- Frank Wilson (1939–1953)

=== Texas ===
- Joe Byrd (1936–1964). He was a captain of the guard in Walls Unit. The prison cemetery, where unclaimed remains of inmates are buried, has been named after him.

=== Virginia ===
- Jerry Givens (1982–1999). He was a Virginia State Penitentiary guard that both operated the state's electric chair and later executed inmates by lethal injection when it became Virginia's official method of execution.

== See also ==
- List of executioners
