= George Fell =

American surgeon and inventor (1849–1918)

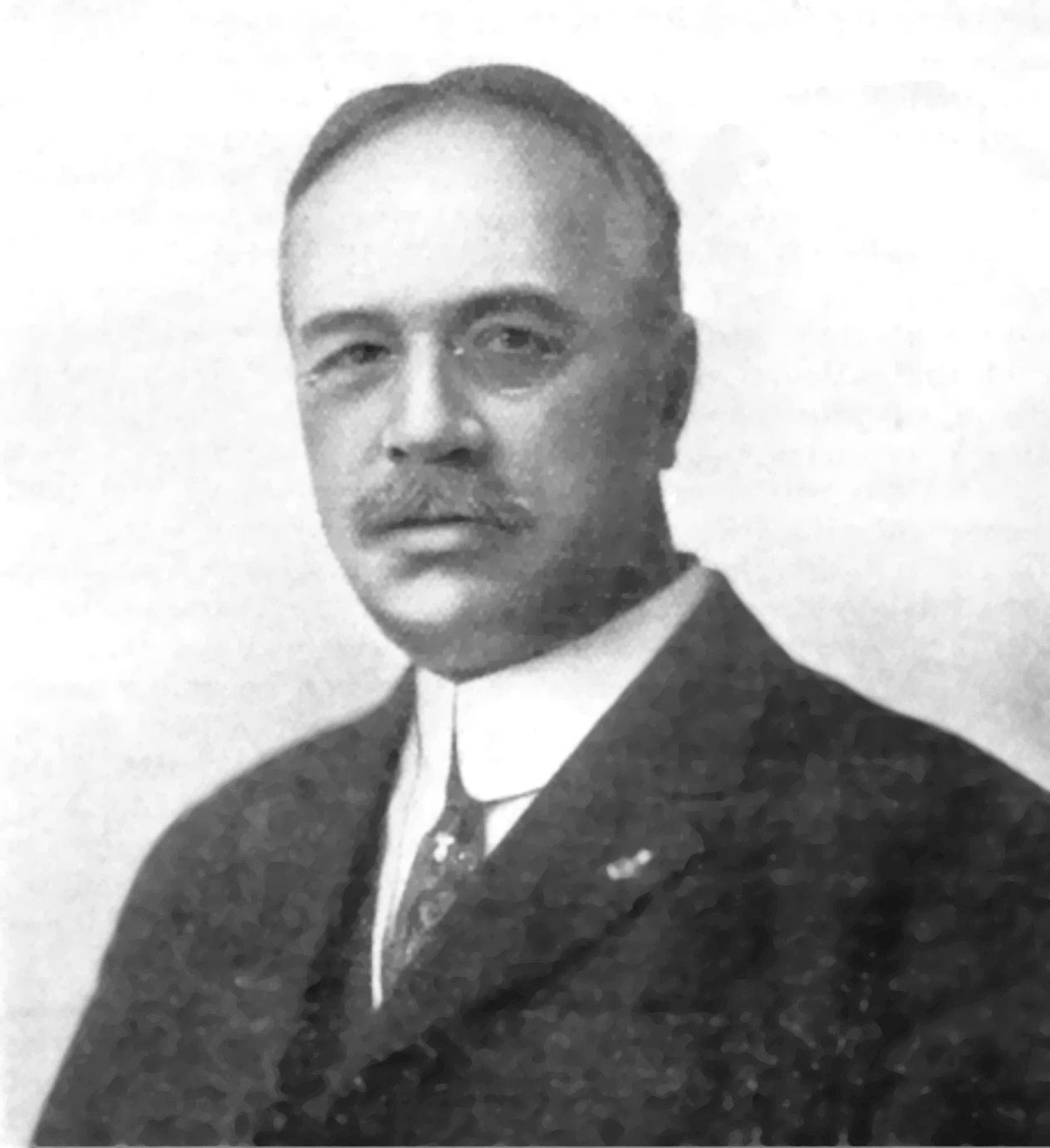
- George Edward Fell
- Born: July 10, 1849; Chippewa, Canada West
- Died: July 29, 1918 (aged 69); Chicago, Illinois, U.S.
- Education: University of Buffalo; Niagara University
- Years active: 1882–1900
- Known for: forced respiration device, research into electrocution, electric chair (design)
- Medical career
- Profession: Engineer; Surgeon; Inventor
- Sub-specialties: physiology; microscopy
- Research: artificial ventilation; electrocution

George Edward Fell (July 10, 1849 – July 29, 1918) was an American surgeon and inventor. He was an early developer of artificial ventilation and also investigated the physiology of electrocution, a line of research that led to Fell creating the final design for the first electric chair.

== Biography ==
Edward George Fell was born in Chippewa, Canada West on July 10, 1849. He was the son of James Wilkins Fell and Ann Elizabeth Hoffman. After high school he studied engineering at the University of Buffalo and was working as a Buffalo City engineer starting in 1869, a post his brother, Charles Fell, eventually took over, planning many of the city's sewer lines. George Fell worked in 1879 as the US engineer on the Ontario–New York State International Bridge at Buffalo. He was a founding member of the American Microscopical Society and its president in 1890. Fell married Annie Argo Duthie (1872) and they eventually had four daughters and one son together. He received a medical degree from the University of Buffalo in 1882 and an ad eundem degree from Niagara University in 1886. George Fell was professor of physiology and microscopy at Niagara University as well as a physician at the Sisters of Charity Hospital in Buffalo up to 1895. He was a surgeon at the Charity Eye Ear Nose and Throat Hospital Buffalo from 1910 to 1916. Fell married Gertrude Luella Axtell of Spokane Washington in 1912 and moved to Chicago in 1917. He died at home in Chicago, Illinois from an enlarged heart on July 29, 1918.

== Studies and inventions ==
=== Artificial ventilation ===
After being unable save the life of a patient suffering from an opioid overdose using the "Silvester Method", a method of artificial ventilation invented by Henry Robert Silvester in which a patient is laid on their back and their arms are raised above their head to aid inhalation and then pressed against their chest to aid exhalation, Fell devised a method of mechanical ventilation using a bellows and a breathing valve to pass air through a tracheotomy, and later, a face mask. He first used his "forced respiration" method, also called the "Fell method" or "Fell Motor" in 1887 and was able to save many lives with it, keeping opiate poisoning patients breathing for several days, but it never became popular.

In 1888–1894 Fell helped Joseph O'Dwyer invent a mechanical ventilator, the Fell-O'Dwyer apparatus. It included tube intubation supplied by a foot-operated bellows and procedure for the insertion and extraction of the tube down the patients trachea, using specially designed instruments.

=== Electrocution studies ===
The late 1870s/early 1880s introduction of arc lighting systems (a new type of bright street light running from central generating stations producing 3000–6000 volts) was followed by the strange new phenomenon of people being killed (almost instantaneously) by the high voltages used. Buffalo dentist Alfred P. Southwick's exploration into this phenomenon would eventually lead to the invention of the electric chair. Early on he enlisted the help of George Fell, along with the head of the Buffalo ASPCA, in whole series of experiments electrocuting hundreds of stray dogs, experimenting with animals in water, out of water, electrode types and placement, and conduction material, eventually coming up with a repeatable method to euthanize animals via electricity. Fell would conduct a further series experiments, electrocuting anesthetized dissected dogs trying to discern exactly how electricity killed a subject. His observations of the animals lead him to believe death was being caused by the heart stopping instantaneously. His experiments were the closest at the time to figuring out the causes of death by electrocution, although he was unaware of the other cause of death, the effect electricity was having on the nervous system.

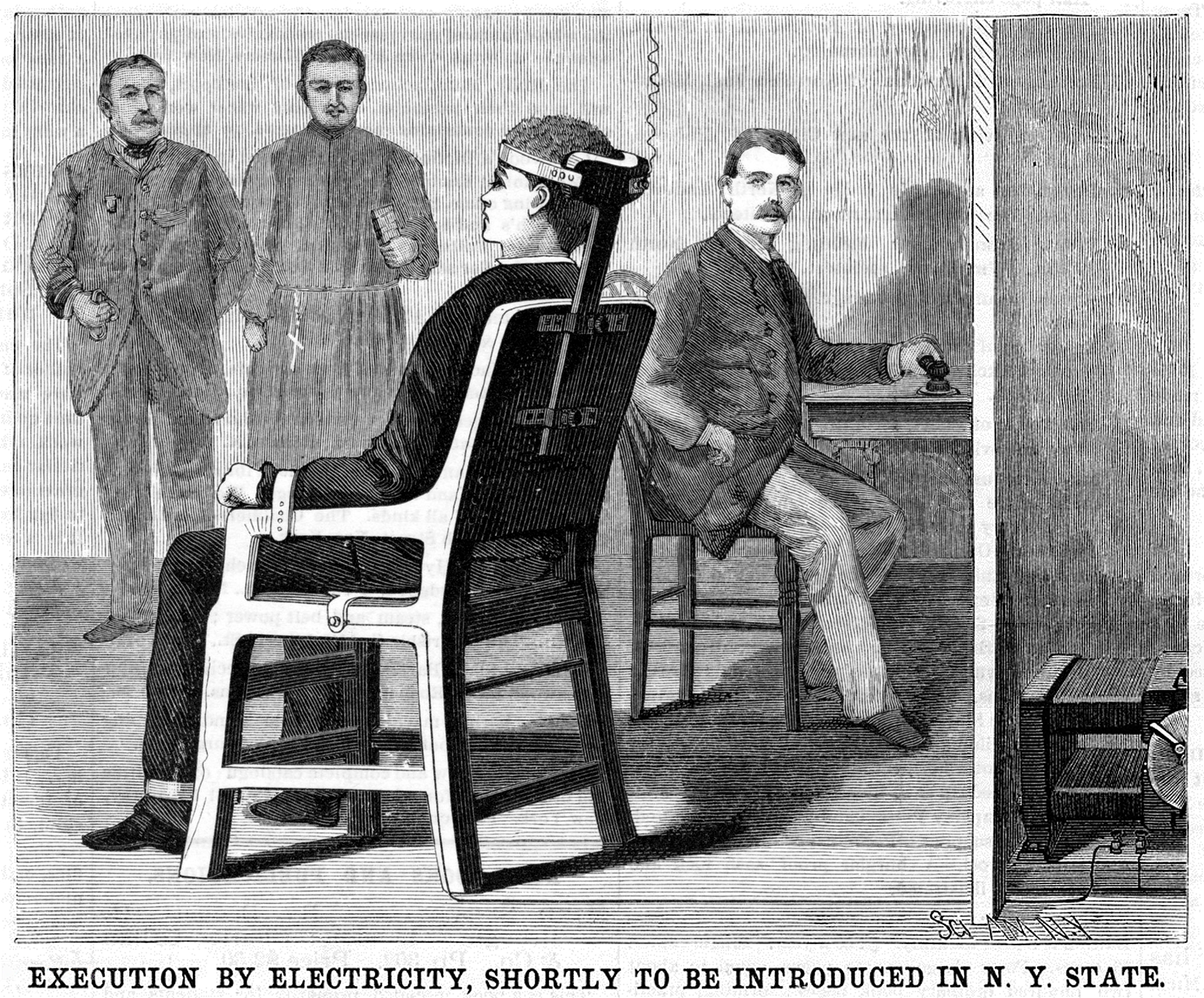
A June 30, 1888 Scientific American illustration of what New York State's electric chair might look like. Its final design was drawn up by George Fell.

Although Fell was opposed to capital punishment he assisted in the development of the electric chair since it was considered a more "humane" form of execution. He demonstrated his experiments and shared his findings on the effects of electrocution with the 1886–1888 New York State Gerry Commission, chaired by the human rights advocate and reformer Elbridge Thomas Gerry, during their investigation to find a more humane form of execution. The mode they finally chose, death via electrocution in the electric chair proposed by commission member Alfred P. Southwick, went through more study and experimentation, mostly by the Medico-Legal Society, before it reached its final design. In 1889 the superintendent of New York Prisons, Austin Lathrop, had George Fell draw up the final plan for the chair, a simple oak construction with a retractable foot rest, restraints, and mounted electrodes. Fell went against the Medico-Legal Society's recommendations, changing the position of the electrodes from foot and head to the head and the lower back. "State electrician" Edwin F. Davis built the first electric chair.

Animal tests on a calf and a horse were conducted at the Auburn Correctional Facility to fine tune the alternating current generator being used. After the calf was electrocuted Fell attempted to revive it by resuscitation using his "forced respiration" method. The attempt was unsuccessful and he gave up after 30 minutes. During the run up to the first execution, that of William Kemmler at Auburn on August 6, 1890, Fell told reporters that he planned to use forced respiration on Kemmler after the electrocution, but he never gained permission from the state. Fell was one of the attending physicians at the electrocution, making sure there was proper contact with the electrodes. After what appeared to be a partially botched execution, with Kemmler found to be still breathing after the first jolt forcing a second application of electricity, Fell was one of the few observers who thought Kemmler didn't suffer, stating "I am still a defender of electrical execution, but I do not entirely defend the manner in which Kemmler was executed".
