= Gerhard Puff =

American criminal (1914–1954)

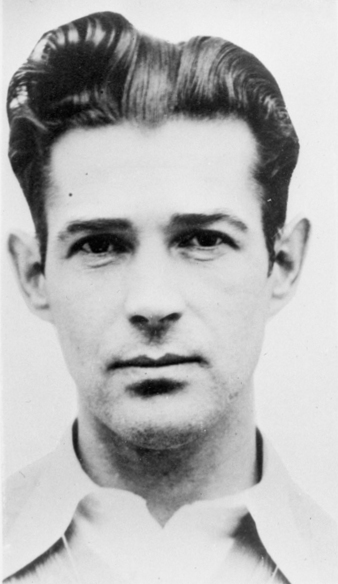
- Gerhard Arthur Puff

FBI Ten Most Wanted Fugitive
- Charges: Bank robbery and murder

Description
- Born: February 13, 1914; Dresden, Saxony, German Empire
- Died: August 12, 1954 (aged 40); Sing Sing Prison, Ossining, New York, U.S.
- Cause of death: Execution by electrocution

Status
- Convictions: First degree murder of a federal employee
- Penalty: Death
- Added: December 3, 1951
- Executed: August 12, 1954 (aged 40)
- Number: 30
- Executed

Gerhard Arthur Puff (February 13, 1914 – August 12, 1954) was a longtime criminal, gangster, and FBI Ten Most Wanted Fugitive who was executed by the federal authorities in New York for killing a federal agent.

== Background ==
Born in Dresden, Germany, the 13-year-old Puff, along with his mother and five-year-old brother, arrived in the U.S. on June 6, 1927, at Ellis Island on board SS Columbus from Bremen. The family moved to Milwaukee, Wisconsin, where he became a naturalized citizen in 1934, but by 1940, he was an inmate in the Wisconsin State Prison in Waupun, Wisconsin. He then would be in and out of prison for the next decade serving several prison terms for disorderly conduct, theft of domestic animals, assault, intent to commit armed robbery, escaping custody, driving stolen vehicles, breaking and entering, and prison escape. On May 2, 1951, Puff was arrested by the Milwaukee Police Department for armed robbery and held on $3,000 bond. While in jail awaiting trial he became acquainted with another FBI Ten most Wanted fugitive, George Arthur Heroux (#28). A few months later, an unknown party paid for his bond. He was scheduled to return for court but never did.

== Bank Robbery and capture ==
In November of 1951, the Johnson County National Bank and Trust Company in Prairie Village, Kansas, was robbed by Puff and Heroux of more than $62,000 in cash, large numbers of American Express Travelers checks and several denominations of Series E, unissued United States government bonds. They entered the bank and forced the tellers to open the vault at gun point before fleeing in a stolen convertible. Both were added the FBI Ten Most Wanted Fugitives List. Heroux was arrested in Miami, Florida, on July 25, 1952 and were able to determine that Puff traveled from Kansas City to Manhattan with his 17-year-old wife, Annie Laurie and was at the Congress Hotel at 19 West 69th Street in New York, FBI agents were waiting to arrest him. He did not remain at Room 904, but returned to the first floor in a few minutes by the stairway where FBI Special Agent Joseph John Brock, aged 44, was stationed. Puff encountered Brock and shot him twice in the chest and took the collapsing officer's gun. Then, with a gun in each hand, Puff zig-zagged through the hotel's lobby, firing another shot at converging agents. Agents outside the hotel called on Puff to surrender. Puff responded with bullets before being shot and collapsing in the street. He was taken to a hospital for treatment, then to the prison ward at Bellevue. Brock was treated by a doctor on the scene, then rushed to a hospital where he was pronounced dead shortly after arrival.

== Death ==
On May 15, 1953, in the United States District Court for the Southern District of New York, Gerhard Arthur Puff was found guilty of murder in the first degree and sentenced to death. Puff's attorney appealed the conviction to no avail. Puff was executed on August 12, 1954, at Sing Sing prison, Ossining, in the electric chair and declared dead at 11:08 p.m. He was one of the first people New York State Electrician Dow Hover was hired to execute.

== See also ==
- Capital punishment by the United States federal government
- List of people executed by the United States federal government
- List of people executed in the United States in 1954
- List of people executed by electrocution
