= John Hulbert (executioner) =

American executioner (1867–1929)

John W. Hulbert
- Born: September 1867; Auburn, New York, US
- Died: February 22, 1929 (aged 61); Auburn, New York, US
- Occupations: Electrician, Executioner
- Employer: State of New York
- Title: State electrician
- Term: 1914–1926
- Predecessor: Edwin F. Davis
- Successor: Robert G. Elliott
- Spouse: Mattie Hulbert

John W. Hulbert Jr. (also given as John Hurlbert or John Hilbert; September 1867 – February 22, 1929) was the executioner for the states of New York, New Jersey and Massachusetts from 1914 to 1926. Hulbert was trained as state electrician by his predecessor, Edwin F. Davis, and oversaw 140 electrocutions during his tenure.

== Life and career ==
=== Training and induction as state electrician ===
A trained electrician, by 1903 Hulbert had become Auburn Prison's chief engineer. Auburn housed one of the three electric chairs in which condemned criminals were put to death by the state of New York, and was also the site of the first electrocution in the world, that of William Kemmler. Edwin Davis, the first state electrician, initially trained two men as executioners: one was Edward B. Currier, his first assistant, and the other was Robert G. Elliott. Since Currier had become state executioner for Massachusetts and Elliott had quit his job at Auburn for some time, Davis selected Hulbert as his new assistant and trained him to perform executions as well.

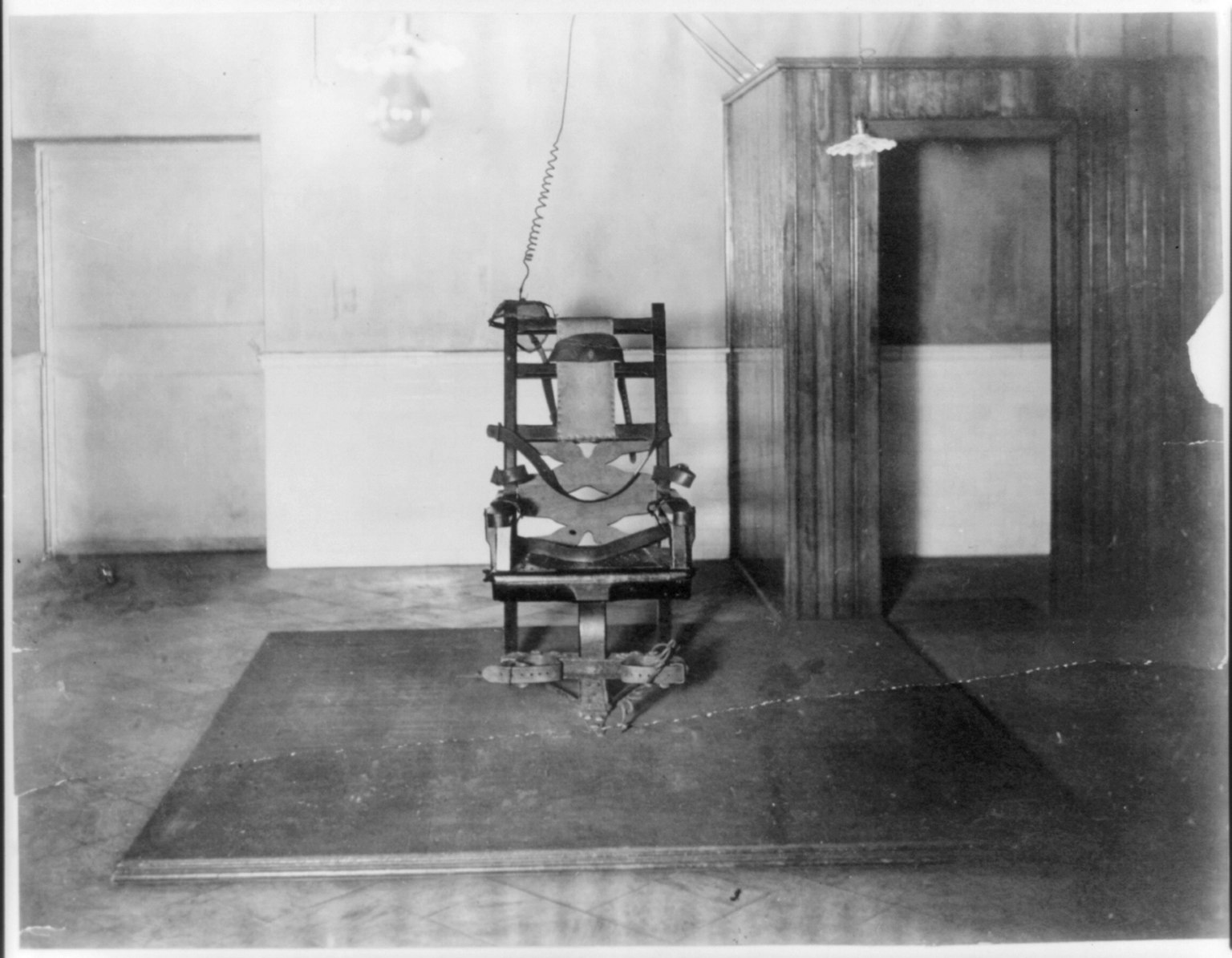
The electric chair in Auburn State Prison: Hulbert was the last state executioner to carry out an execution in this chair

In the summer of 1914, Davis fell ill and was unable to officiate at an execution, which had to be performed by Currier. Since Davis subsequently resigned his post, Hulbert was hired as his successor: when, on August 31, 1914, George Coyer and Giuseppe DeGioia were executed in Auburn's electric chair, newspaper reports noted the presence of a new executioner, whose identity wasn't revealed to the press. Hulbert initially received a fee of $50 per execution, although Davis had been paid $250. The amount later increased to $100 and then to $150, which became the standard fee for all subsequent New York state electricians.

=== Career as New York's state electrician ===
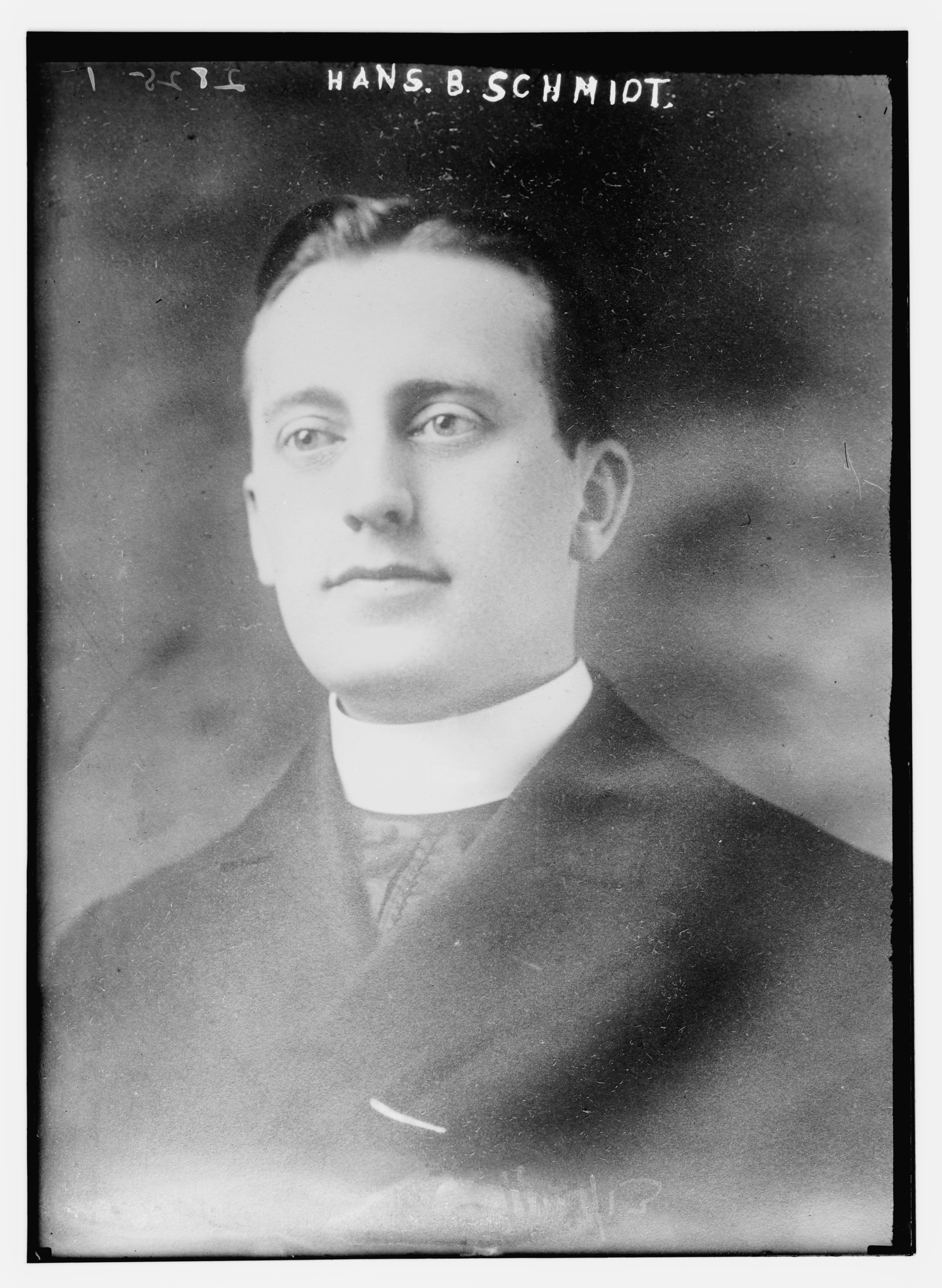
Hans Schmidt, the only Catholic priest executed for murder in the United States, was electrocuted by John Hulbert on February 18, 1916

In his first two years as state electrician, Hulbert officiated at 38 executions in the state of New York, including that of Charles Becker, a lieutenant of the NYPD, and that of Hans B. Schmidt, the only Catholic priest executed for murder in the United States. Hulbert went to lengths to maintain his privacy: he never allowed the press to obtain a photograph and managed to remain anonymous for some time; newspapers described him as "the man who walks alone". On May 1, 1916, Hulbert electrocuted Charles Sprague, the last inmate executed in Auburn Prison: all subsequent executions in New York took place in Sing Sing.

By 1920, Hulbert had been identified as the state electrician, his name now regularly being mentioned by the press, but he kept shunning publicity nonetheless. When Nebraska adopted the electric chair as a method of execution, Hulbert was hired to install the state's new electric chair and conduct the execution of the first two men who were to be put to death using the new method. Hulbert travelled to the Nebraska State Penitentiary and completed all necessary preparations, but fled the state upon learning that a group of locals who opposed capital punishment were planning to lynch him in protest; the two scheduled executions were eventually carried out by E.B. Currier, who had retired as Massachusetts' state executioner but accepted the job in Nebraska.

When Sing Sing new "death house" was built in 1922, Hulbert oversaw the relocation of the electric chair, nicknamed Old Sparky, into the new death chamber.

On May 27, 1920, Hulbert reportedly executed a man he knew, Leo Jankowski, who had been serving a life sentence in Dannemora and had killed a prison guard during an escape attempt together with an accomplice, who was also executed. Jankowski had reportedly worked with Hulbert in Auburn Prison's powerhouse before being transferred to Dannemora, and was quoted as saying "Do a good job, John" as he entered Sing Sing's death chamber.

Sing Sing prison physician Amos Squire, who had to be present at every execution, came to know Hulbert well and devoted one chapter of his Sing Sing memoirs describing the executioner. Squire, who renders Hulbert's surname as Hilbert, writes of a "short and stocky man" who always avoided reading crime news as he didn't want to read about criminals that he could have been called to execute.

Unlike Edwin Davis (who had electrocuted Martha M. Place, the first woman executed in the electric chair, and Mary Farmer), Hulbert never had to execute a woman. In June 1921, he was due to electrocute Hattle Dixon, a Brooklyn woman convicted for murder, but her sentence was commuted to life imprisonment by governor Miller. A few days before the scheduled execution, newspapers quoted Hulbert as having said he had no scruples about executing a woman.

According to Squire, Hulbert became significantly depressed about his job, but performed the duty for the $150 fee, claiming he didn't make enough money as a chief engineer. On January 7, 1916, Hulbert arrived in Sing Sing to execute Antonio Ponton. The execution was scheduled at 5 am, but there was an escape attempt in another part of the prison a few hours before. As tension rose among prison officials, Hulbert suffered a nervous collapse and had to be revived by Squire, eventually carrying out the execution with a half an hour delay and spending a full week recovering in Sing Sing's hospital.

Hulbert thought frequently about resigning his post, but waited until he became eligible for a pension as Auburn's chief engineer, which happened in late June 1925. A few months after conducting his last execution on September 17, 1925, Hulbert officially retired as state electrician on January 16, 1926, on the eve of a scheduled double execution in Sing Sing. Reportedly, Hulbert gave no reason for his decision in the letter of resignation he wrote, but was quoted as saying "I got tired of killing people." Hulbert had executed a total of 140 men: 120 of them were electrocuted in the state of New York.

Hulbert was succeeded by Robert G. Elliott, who had also been trained by Edwin Davis.

=== Later life and death ===
In the fall of 1928, Mattie, Hulbert's wife, died and the former executioner became further depressed. On February 22, 1929, Hulbert went into the cellar of his home in Auburn and committed suicide by shooting himself.

== See also ==
- List of executioners
