= Leon Czolgosz =

Assassin of William McKinley (1873–1901)

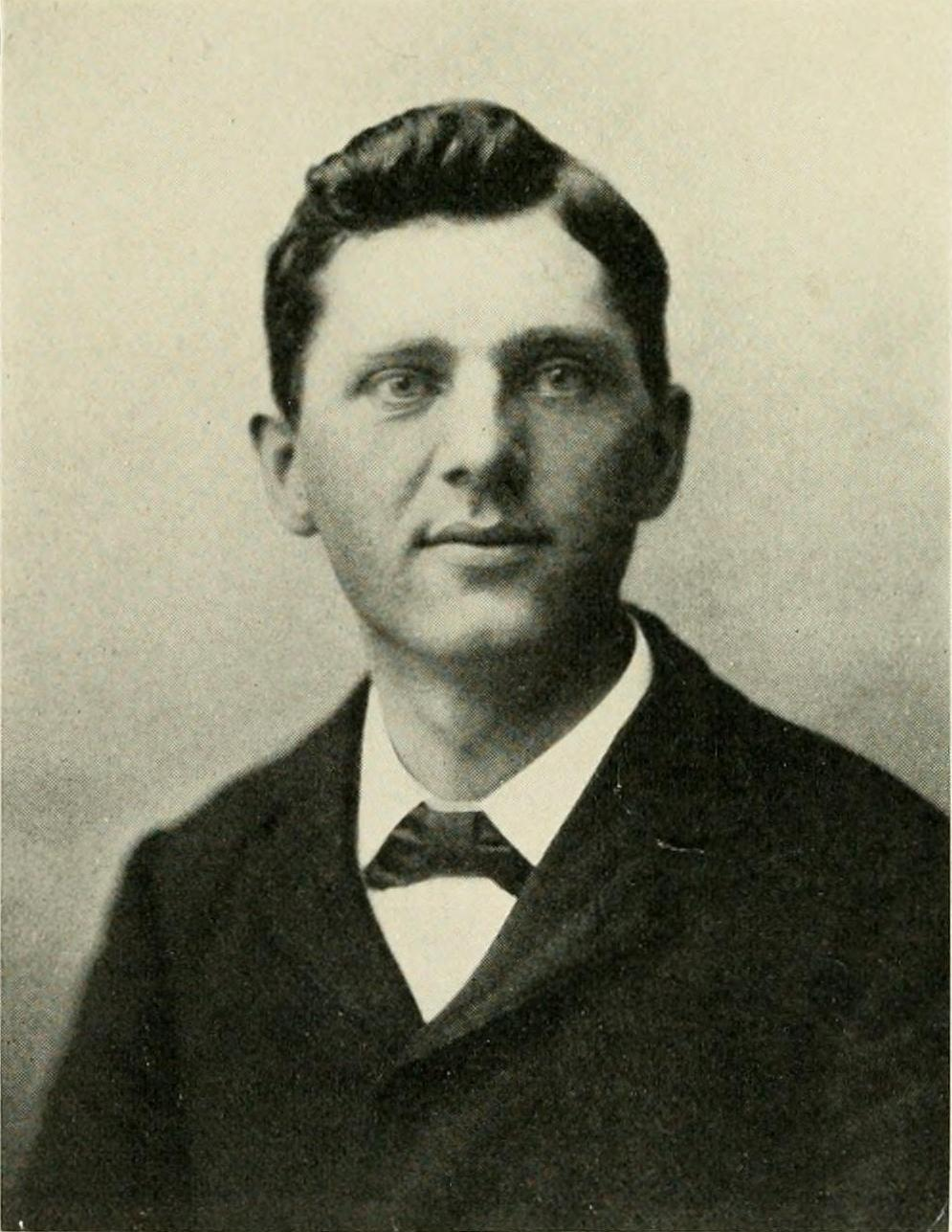
- Czolgosz in 1899
- Born: Leon Frank Czolgosz; May 5, 1873; Detroit, Michigan, U.S.
- Died: October 29, 1901 (aged 28); Auburn Prison, Auburn, New York, U.S.
- Other name: Fred C. Nieman
- Occupation: Wireworker
- Status: Executed by electrocution
- Motive: To advance anarchism
- Conviction: First degree murder
- Penalty: Death

Details
- Victims: William McKinley
- Date: September 6, 1901 (died September 14, 1901)
- Locations: Temple of Music on the grounds of the Pan-American Exposition in Buffalo, New York, U.S.

Leon Frank Czolgosz (/ˈtʃɒlɡɒʃ/ CHOL-gosh; Polish: [ˈlɛɔn ˈt͡ʂɔwɡɔʂ]; May 5, 1873 – October 29, 1901) was an American wireworker and anarchist who assassinated United States president William McKinley in 1901. Czolgosz had lost his job during the economic Panic of 1893 and turned to anarchism. He regarded McKinley as a symbol of oppression and believed that it was his duty as an anarchist to assassinate him. Czolgosz shot McKinley in Buffalo, New York, on September 6, 1901, and was immediately arrested. McKinley died on September 14 after his wound became infected with Gangrene. A month later, Czolgosz was convicted of first degree murder and was sentenced to death. He was executed by the electric chair on October 29.

== Early life ==
Leon Frank Czolgosz was born in Detroit, Michigan, on May 5, 1873. (Note: His three older brothers, Waldeck, Frank and Joseph, were born in Poland while Leon was the first of his siblings to be born in the United States.) Leon was the fourth of eight children born to the Polish-American family of Paul (Paweł) Czolgosz and his wife Mary (Marianna) Nowak. (Note: Czolgosz's ancestors probably came from what is now Belarus. His father may have immigrated to the US in the 1860s from Astravyets (Ostrowiec) near Wilno. When he arrived in the United States, he gave his ethnicity as Hungarian and changed the spelling of his surname from Zholhus (Жолгусь, Żołguś) to Czolgosz.) Paul Czolgosz lived in Rogers City, Michigan, around 1875, when the town's primary businessman Albert Molitor was assassinated by a group of 17 men. After the McKinley assassination, newspapers reported that Paul Czolgosz had been involved in the killing of Molitor, a charge which other members of the family denied.

The family moved to Alpena, Michigan, in 1880. When Leon was 10 and the family was living in Posen, Michigan, Czolgosz's mother died six weeks after giving birth to his sister, Victoria. In 1889, the Czolgosz family moved to Natrona, Pennsylvania, where Czolgosz worked at a glass factory. When he was 17, they moved to Cleveland, Ohio, where he found employment at the Cleveland Rolling Mill Company.

After the economic crash of 1893, when the mill closed for some time and tried to reduce wages, the workers went on strike. With great economic and social turmoil around him, Czolgosz found little comfort in the Catholic Church and other immigrant institutions; he sought others who shared his concerns regarding injustice. Czolgosz joined a moderate working man's socialist club, the Knights of the Golden Eagle, and eventually a more radical socialist group known as the Sila Club, where he became interested in anarchism.

== Interest in anarchism ==
In 1898, after witnessing a series of similar strikes, many ending in violence, and perhaps ill from a respiratory disease, Czolgosz went to live with his father, who had bought a 50-acre (20 ha) farm the year before in Warrensville, Ohio.

Czolgosz became a recluse. He was impressed after hearing a speech by the anarchist Emma Goldman, whom Czolgosz met for the first time at one of her lectures in Cleveland in May 1901. After the lecture, Czolgosz approached the speakers' platform and asked her for reading recommendations. On the afternoon of July 12, 1901, he visited her at the home of Abraham Isaak, publisher of the newspaper Free Society, in Chicago and introduced himself as Fred C. Nieman (nobody), (Note: Czolgosz also sometimes used the surname "Nieman" ["Nobody"] and variations thereof) but Goldman was on her way to the train station. Czolgosz told her that he was disappointed in Cleveland's socialists, and Goldman quickly introduced him to anarchist friends who were at the train station.

Goldman, who nine years earlier had conspired to assassinate industrialist Henry Clay Frick, later wrote a piece in defense of Czolgosz: "Who can tell how many times this American child has gloried in the celebration of the 4th of July, or on Decoration Day, when he faithfully honored the nation's dead? Who knows but what he, too, was willing to 'fight for his country and die for her liberty'".

In the weeks that followed, Czolgosz's social awkwardness, evasiveness, and blunt inquiries about secret societies around Isaak and another anarchist, Emil Schilling, resulted in the radical Free Society newspaper to issue a warning pertaining to him on September 1, reading:

ATTENTION! The attention of the comrades is called to another spy. He is well dressed, of medium height, rather narrow shoulders, blond and about 25 years of age. Up to the present he has made his appearance in Chicago and Cleveland. In the former place he remained but a short time, while in Cleveland he disappeared when the comrades had confirmed themselves of his identity and were on the point of exposing him. His demeanor is of the usual sort, pretending to be greatly interested in the cause, asking for names or soliciting aid for acts of contemplated violence. If this same individual makes his appearance elsewhere the comrades are warned in advance, and can act accordingly.

— Everet Marshell, Free Society

Czolgosz believed there was a great injustice in American society, an inequality which allowed the wealthy to enrich themselves by exploiting the poor. He concluded that the reason for this was the structure of government. Around this time, Czolgosz learned of the assassination of a leader in Europe, King Umberto I of Italy, who had been shot dead by anarchist Gaetano Bresci on July 29, 1900. Bresci told the press that he had decided to take matters into his own hands for the sake of the common man. As well as carrying a clipping of the report with him, in September 1901 Czolgosz deliberately purchased what he thought was the same model of revolver as Bresci had used in the assassination.

== Assassination of President William McKinley ==
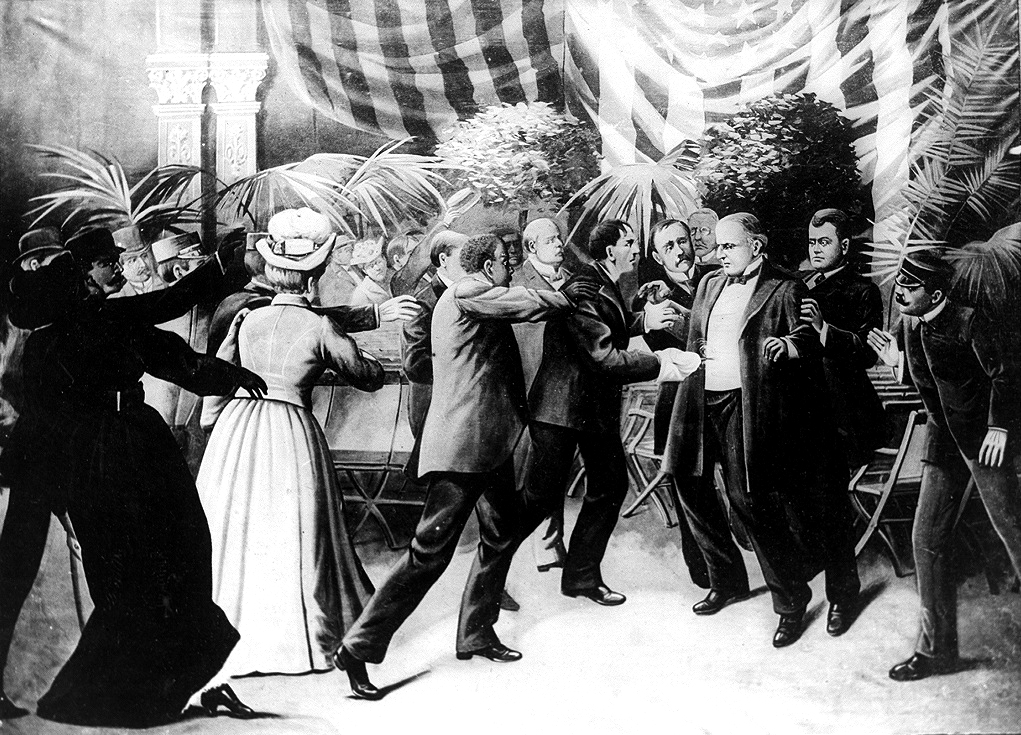
Drawing by T. Dart Walker depicting Czolgosz shooting McKinley

On August 31, 1901, Czolgosz traveled to Buffalo, New York, the site of the Pan-American Exposition, where President McKinley would be speaking. He rented a room in Nowak's Hotel at 1078 Broadway.

On September 6, Czolgosz went to the exposition armed with a concealed Iver Johnson "Safety Automatic" revolver he had purchased four days earlier. He joined McKinley's receiving line in the Temple of Music. At 4:07 p.m., Czolgosz reached the front of the line. While McKinley extended his hand, Czolgosz slapped it aside, and shot McKinley twice in the abdomen at point-blank range: the first bullet ricocheted off a coat button and lodged in McKinley's jacket while the other bullet pierced his stomach.

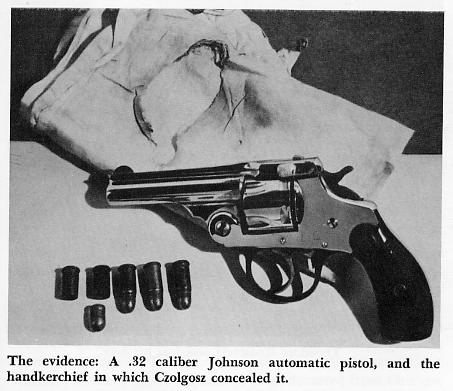
The revolver used to shoot McKinley

As onlookers gazed in horror, and as McKinley lurched forward a step, Czolgosz prepared to take a third shot but James Parker, a man standing directly behind Czolgosz, struck him in the neck and knocked the gun out of his hand; Parker, policemen, and artillerymen began beating Czolgosz. He was heard to say, "I done my duty." "Go easy on him, boys," McKinley urged the mob. The police struggled to keep the angry crowd off Czolgosz, who was badly pummeled. Czolgosz was dragged away, but not before being searched by Secret Service Agent Foster. When Czolgosz kept turning his head to watch the president while being searched, Foster struck him to the ground with one punch. He was taken to Buffalo's 13th Precinct house at 346 Austin Street and held in a cell until being moved to police headquarters.

McKinley's stomach wound was not lethal, but he died eight days later on September 14 of an infection that had spread from the wound.

== Trial and execution ==
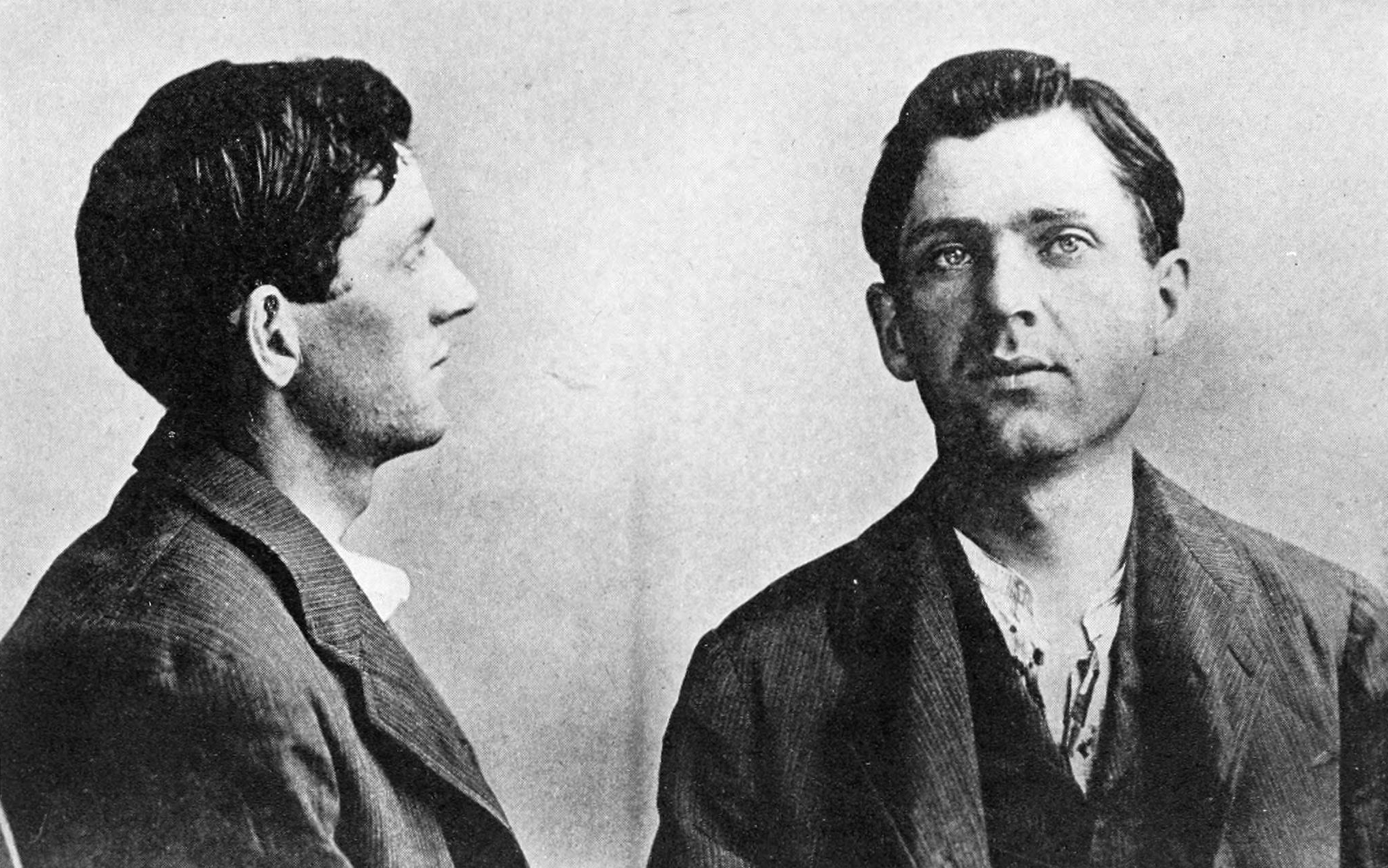
Czolgosz's police mugshot, September 7, 1901

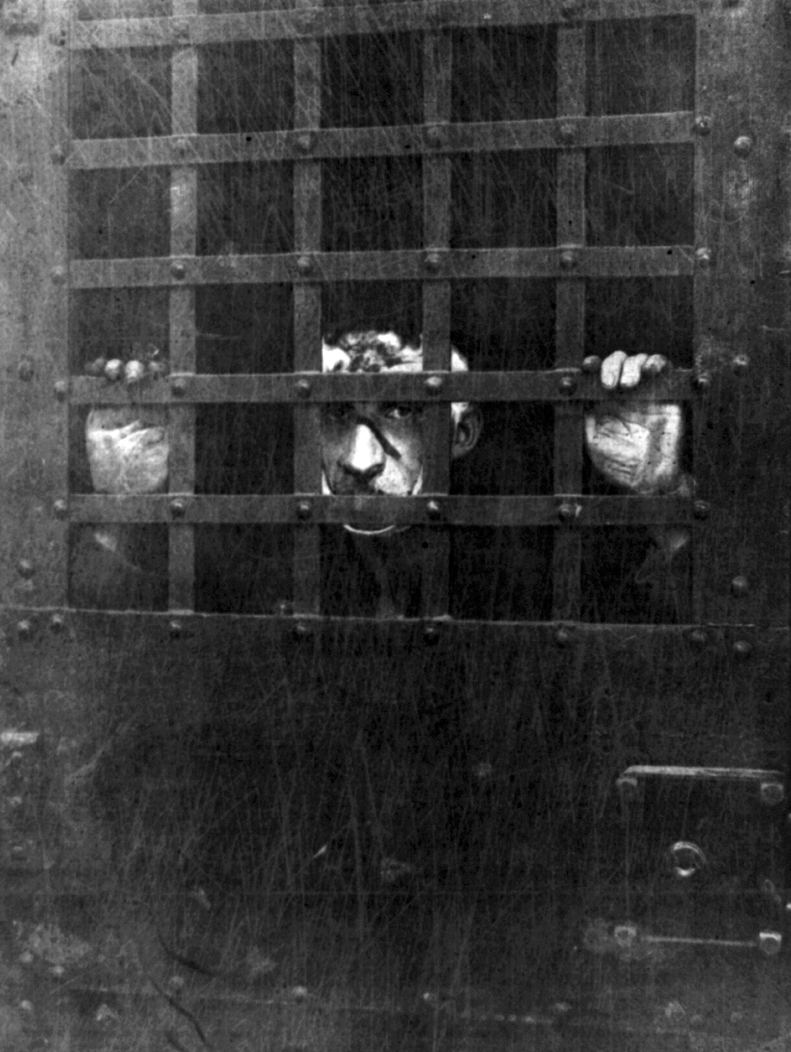
The first photograph released of Czolgosz in jail, September 9, 1901

After McKinley's death, new President Theodore Roosevelt declared, "When compared with the suppression of anarchy, every other question sinks into insignificance."

On September 13, the day before McKinley succumbed to his wounds, Czolgosz was taken from the police headquarters, which was undergoing repairs, and transferred to the Erie County Women's Penitentiary temporarily. Three days later, he was brought to the Erie County Jail to be arraigned before County Judge Emery. After the arraignment, Czolgosz was transferred to Auburn Prison.

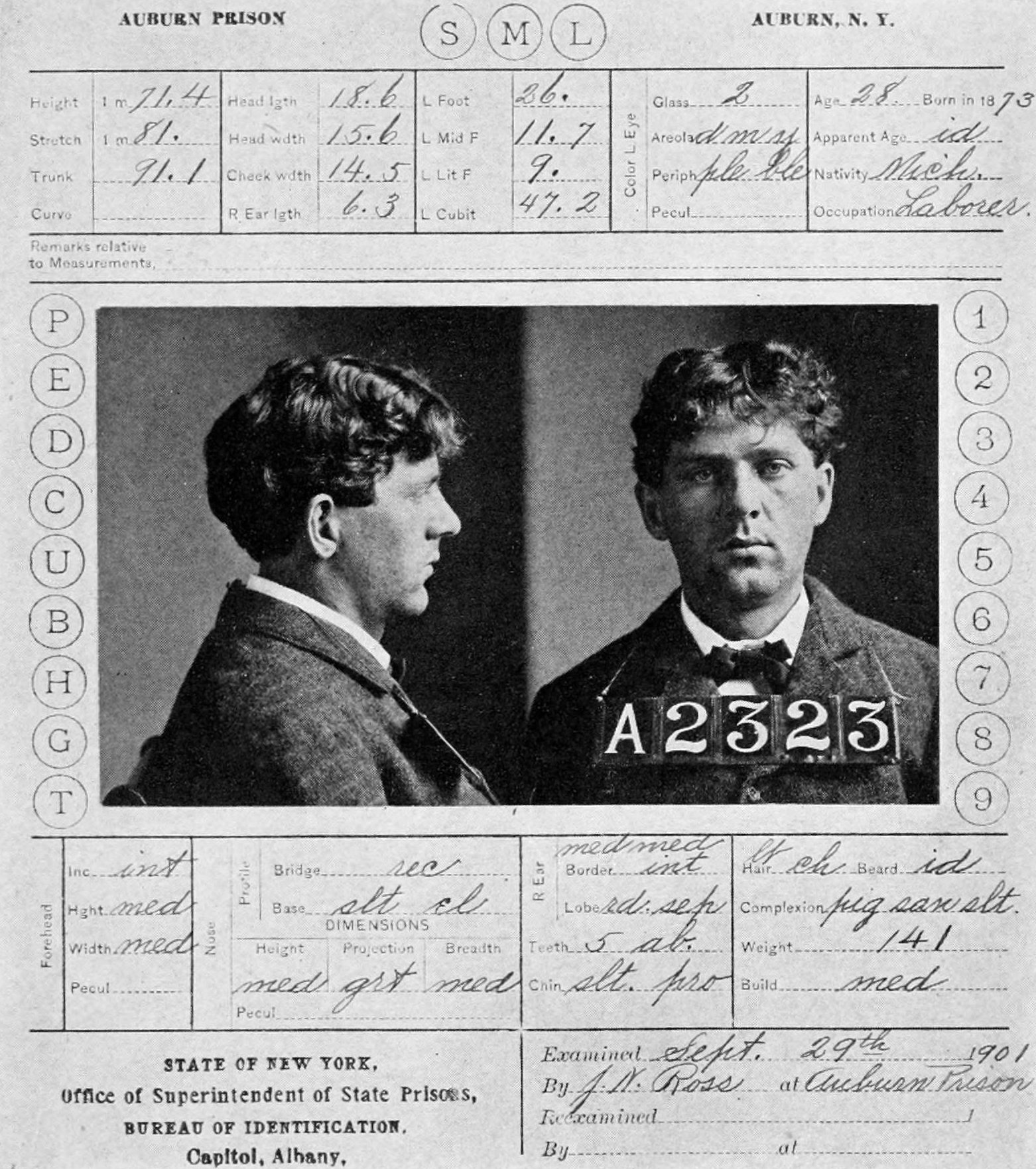
Czolgosz's Auburn Prison file, September 29, 1901

A grand jury indicted Czolgosz on September 16 with one count of first-degree murder. During his incarceration, Czolgosz spoke freely with his guards, but he refused every interaction with Robert C. Titus and Loran L. Lewis, the prominent judges-turned-attorneys assigned to defend him, and with the expert psychiatrist sent to test his sanity.

The case was prosecuted by the Erie County District Attorney, Thomas Penney, and assistant D.A. Frederick Haller. Although Czolgosz answered that he was pleading "Guilty", presiding Judge Truman C. White overruled him and entered a "Not Guilty" plea on his behalf.

Czolgosz's trial began in the state courthouse in Buffalo on September 23, 1901, nine days after McKinley died. Prosecution testimony took two days and consisted principally of the doctors who treated McKinley and various eyewitnesses to the shooting. Lewis and his co-counsel called no witnesses, which Lewis in his closing argument attributed to Czolgosz's refusal to cooperate with them. In his 27-minute address to the jury, Lewis took pains to praise McKinley.

Scott Miller, author of The President and the Assassin, notes that the closing argument was more calculated to defend the attorney's "place in the community, rather than an effort to spare his client the electric chair".

Even had the jury believed the defense that Czolgosz was insane, by claiming that no sane man would have shot and killed the president in such a public and blatant manner, knowing he would be caught, there was still the legal definition of insanity to overcome. Under New York law, Czolgosz was legally insane only if he was unable to understand what he was doing. The jury was unconvinced of Czolgosz's insanity due to the directions given to them by Judge White; they voted to convict him after less than a half-hour of deliberations (a jury member later said it would have been sooner but they wanted to review the evidence before conviction).

Czolgosz had two visits the night before his execution, one with two clergymen and another later in the night with his brother, Waldeck Czolgosz, and brother-in-law, Frank Bandowski. Even though Czolgosz refused Father Fudzinski and Father Hickey twice, Superintendent Collins permitted their visit and escorted them to his cell. The priests pleaded for 45 minutes for Czolgosz to repent, but he refused, so they left. Czolgosz's brother Waldeck and brother-in-law Frank Bandowski visited after the priests had left. Waldeck asked Czolgosz, "Who got you into this scrape?", to which Czolgosz responded, "No one. Nobody had anything to do with it but me." His brother said it was unlike Czolgosz and was not how he was raised. When asked by his brother if he wanted the priests to come back, Czolgosz said, "No, damn them. Don't send them here again. I don't want them," and, "Don't you have any praying over me when I am dead. I don't want it. I don't want any of their damned religion." Czolgosz's father wrote a letter to his son the night before his execution, wishing Czolgosz luck and informing him that he could no longer help him, and Leon had to "pay the price for his actions". Although after the trial, Czolgosz and his attorneys were informed of his right to appeal the sentence, they chose not to after Czolgosz declined. The attorneys also knew that there were no grounds for appeal; the trial had been "quick, swift, and fair".

Czolgosz's last words were: "I killed the President because he was the enemy of the good people – the good working people. I am not sorry for my crime. I am sorry I could not see my father." Czolgosz was electrocuted by three jolts, each of 1,800 volts, in Auburn Prison on October 29, 1901, 45 days after McKinley's death. He was electrocuted at 7:12 a.m. and pronounced dead at 7:14 a.m. The state electrician (executioner) of Czolgosz was Edwin Davis.

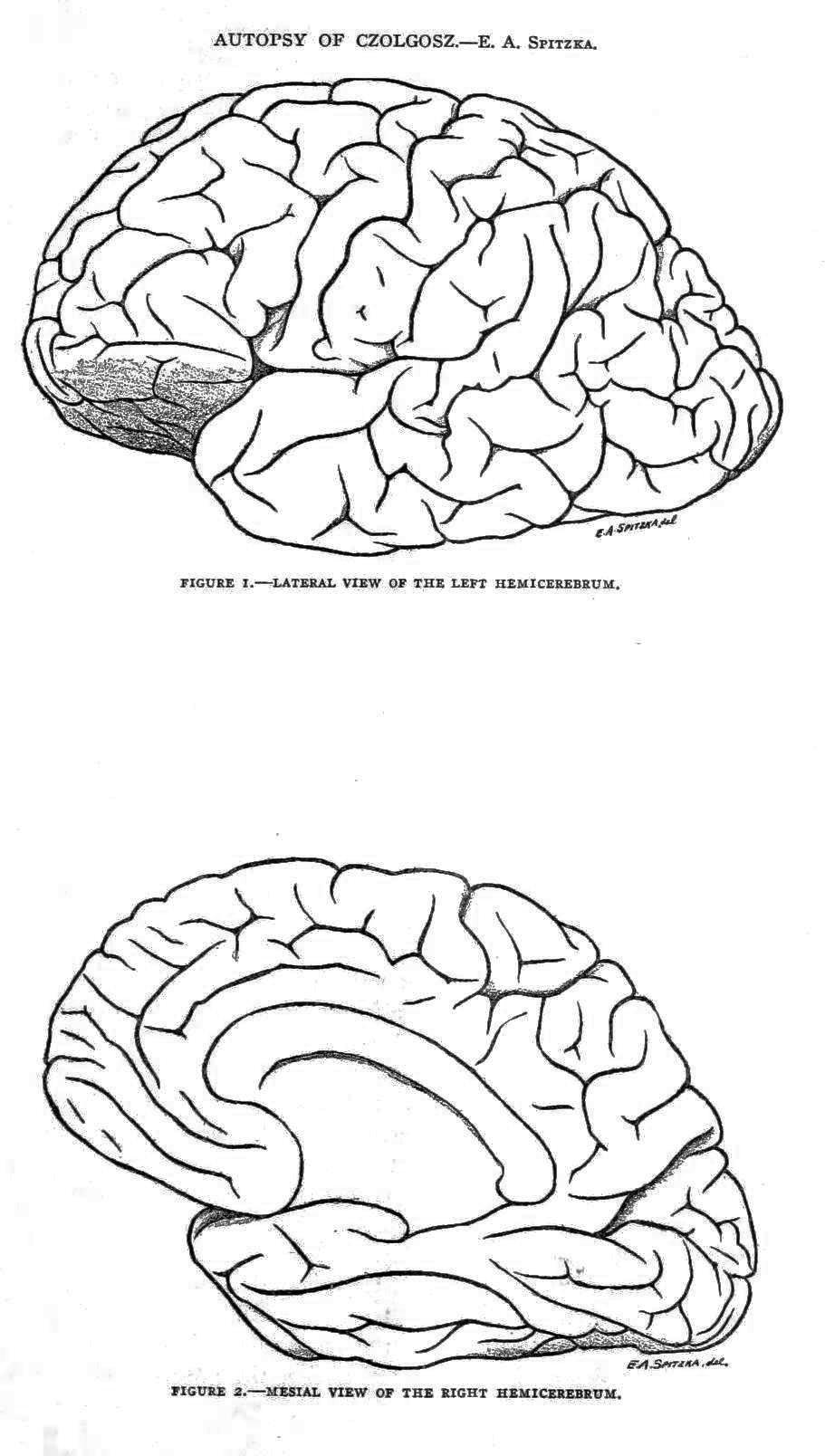
Czolgosz's brain autopsy

Waldeck Czolgosz and Frank Bandowski attended the execution. When Waldeck asked the warden for his brother's body, to be taken for proper burial, he was informed that he "would never be able to take it away", and that crowds of people would mob him.

Czolgosz was autopsied by John E. Gerin; (Note: Everett 1901, p. 448. "The physicians were: Dr. Carlos F. MacDonald of New York and Dr. Gerin of Auburn. Other witnesses were: E. Bonesteel, Troy; W. D. Wolff, Rochester; C. F. Rattigan, Auburn; George R. Peck, Auburn, N.Y.; W. N. Thayer, former warden of Dannemora prison, who assisted Warden Mead, and three newspaper correspondents.") his brain was autopsied by Edward Anthony Spitzka. The autopsy showed his teeth were normal but in poor condition; likewise, the external genitals were normal, although scars were present, the result of chancroids. The autopsy showed the deceased was in good health; a death mask was made of his face. The body was buried on prison grounds. Prison authorities had planned to inter the body with quicklime to hasten its decomposition, but decided otherwise after testing quicklime on a sample of meat. After determining that they were not legally limited to the use of quicklime for the process, they poured sulfuric acid into Czolgosz's coffin so that his body would be completely disfigured. The warden estimated that the acid caused the body to disintegrate within 12 hours. His clothes and possessions were burned in the prison incinerator to discourage exhibitions of his life.

Czolgosz is buried at Soule Cemetery in Cayuga County, New York. His grave is unmarked, with a stone reading, "Fort Hill Remains".

Emma Goldman was arrested on suspicion of being involved in the assassination, but was released due to insufficient evidence. Goldman later incurred a great deal of negative publicity when she published "The Tragedy at Buffalo", comparing Czolgosz to Marcus Junius Brutus, assassin of Julius Caesar, and called McKinley the "president of the money kings and trust magnates". Other anarchists and radicals were unwilling to support Goldman's effort to aid Czolgosz, believing that he had harmed the movement.

The scene of the crime, the Temple of Music, was demolished in November 1901, along with the rest of the Exposition's temporary structures. A stone marker in the median of Fordham Drive, now a residential street in Buffalo, marks the approximate spot (42°56.321′N 78°52.416′W) where the shooting occurred. Czolgosz's revolver is on display in the Pan-American Exposition exhibit at the Buffalo History Museum in Buffalo.

After Czolgosz's death, Lloyd Vernon Briggs (1863–1941), a Boston alienist who later became the Director of the Massachusetts Department for Mental Hygiene, reviewed the Czolgosz case in 1901 on behalf of psychiatrist Walter Channing (1849–1921), concluding Czolgosz was insane; that conclusion has since been challenged.

== Portrayals in media ==
Dramatic reenactment of Czolgosz's execution, shot by Edison Studios, October 29, 1901

- Czolgosz's execution was portrayed in the 1901 silent film Execution of Czolgosz with Panorama of Auburn Prison.
- Czolgosz is featured as a central character of Stephen Sondheim's musical Assassins; his assassination of McKinley takes place during a musical number called "The Ballad of Czolgosz".
- Czolgosz's assassination of McKinley is dramatized in Murder at the Fair (2006), an episode of the History Channel miniseries 10 Days That Unexpectedly Changed America.
- In season 7, episode 15, of the CBC Television period drama series Murdoch Mysteries, "The Spy Who Came Up to the Cold" (2014), Czolgosz is portrayed by Goran Stjepanovic.
- Czolgosz's shooting of McKinley is depicted in the miniseries Theodore Roosevelt (2022).

== See also ==
- List of people executed in the United States in 1901
- John Wilkes Booth – assassin of Abraham Lincoln
- Charles J. Guiteau – assassin of James A. Garfield
- Lee Harvey Oswald – assassin of John F. Kennedy
