= John Gerin =

John Gerin may refer to:

- John L. Gerin, American virologist
- John E. Gerin, American prison physician

== See also ==
- John Guerin, American percussionist
