= Robert G. Elliott =

American executioner (1874–1939)

Robert Greene Elliott
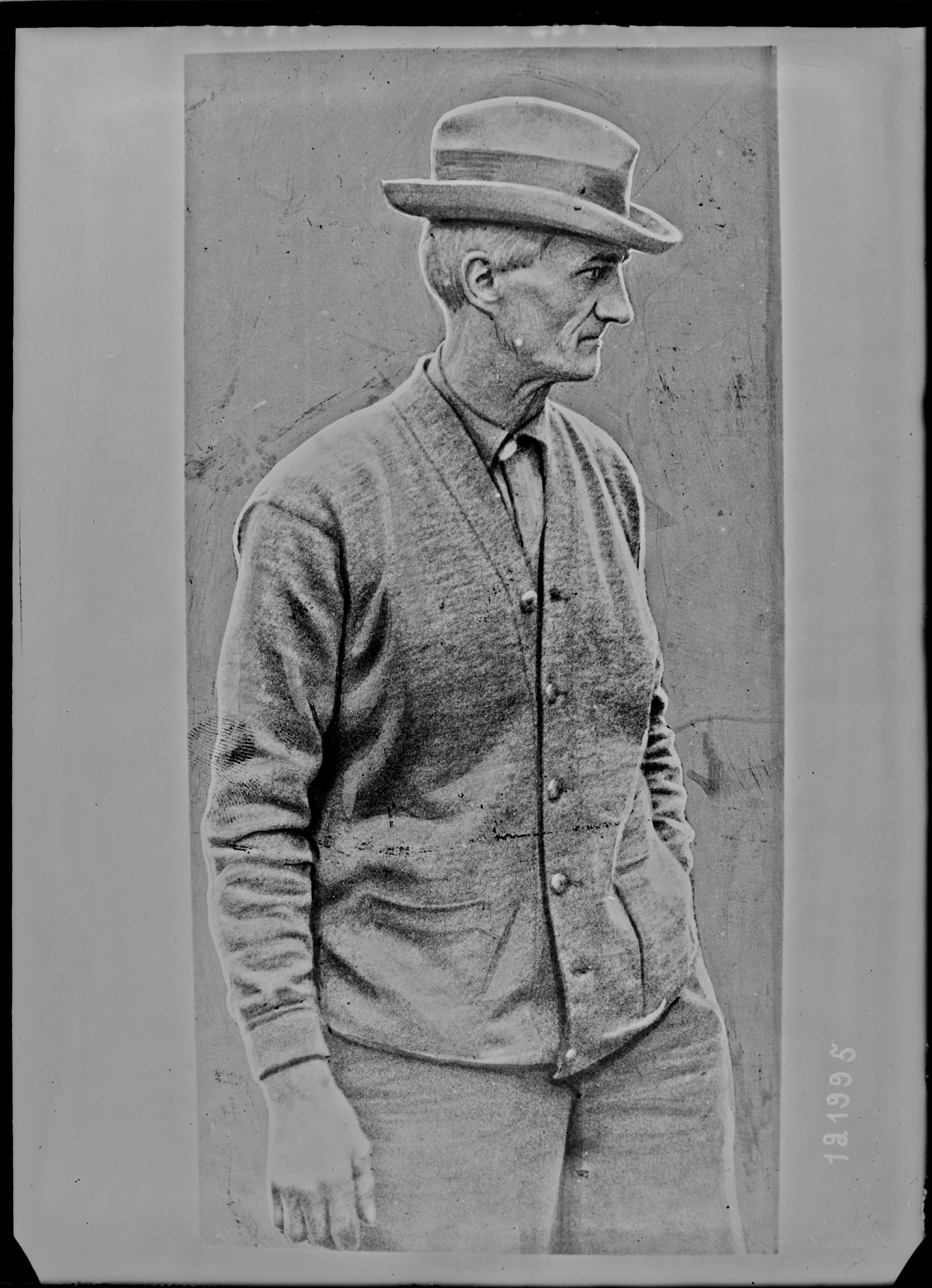
- Elliott in 1927
- Born: January 27, 1874; Hamlin, New York, US
- Died: October 10, 1939 (aged 65); Richmond Hill, New York, US
- Resting place: Nassau Knolls Cemetery, Port Washington, New York
- Occupations: Electrician, Executioner
- Employer: State of New York
- Title: State electrician
- Term: 1926–1939
- Predecessor: John Hulbert (executioner)
- Successor: Joseph Francel

Robert Greene Elliott (January 27, 1874 – October 10, 1939) was the New York State Electrician (i.e., executioner) – and for those neighboring states that used the electric chair, including New Jersey, Pennsylvania, Vermont, and Massachusetts – during the period 1926–1939.

== Biography ==
He was born in Hamlin, New York, the son of Irish immigrants Thomas Elliott and Martha Jane Elliott (née Rowley). As a child he was a devout Methodist, and at one point his parents wanted him to be a minister. As a young boy Elliott recounts that he read of the first use of the electric chair and wondered what it might be like to throw the switch at an execution. He became employed in the prison service as a regular electrician, ultimately in charge of the power-house at Dannemora Prison in upstate New York. In that capacity he remotely assisted Edwin Davis at electrocutions at Dannemora State Prison. Initially his involvement was to change the armatures on the generator in the power house, so that it would temporarily produce enough power to send over high-tension wires to the electric chair elsewhere in the prison complex.

In his memoirs titled "Agent of Death", he recounted that when Davis visited Dannemora to conduct executions, he would be invited to dinner at Elliott's nearby house. This on-the-job training and personal rapport with Davis ultimately stood him in good stead in 1926 when he applied for and accepted the post of "State electrician", which had just fallen vacant by John Hulbert. On January 28, 1926, he officiated at his first execution, the double electrocution of Emil Klatt and Luigi Rapito. Although not wearing a mask or a hood, he tried to conceal his identity at first, not revealing his name.

For each execution he was paid the same fee of $150 (equivalent to $3,000 in 2025). When he performed multiple executions on a single day, he would be paid $150 only for the first one and then an extra $50 ($909) for each additional convict he executed. This was standard practice in New York since John Hulbert had become the second State electrician and was never changed. It has been estimated that Elliott earned as much as $46,000 from electrocutions (equivalent to $837,000 in 2025).

Elliott is credited with perfecting judicial execution by electrocution, establishing what would come to be known as the "Elliott method". He usually made the first contact at 2000 volts, holding it there for 3 seconds. Then he lowered the voltage to 500 volts for the rest of the first minute; raised it to 2,000 volts for a further 3 seconds; lowered the voltage to 500 volts for the rest of the second minute; then raised it again to 2000 volts for a few seconds before shutting off the power. Elliott recommended that the ideal amperage for executions was around 8 amps. This technique was also used by his two successors.

Elliott's method was intended to render the victim unconscious in an instant with the first massive shock, while the lower voltage heated the vital organs to a point where life was extinguished, without causing undue bodily burning. This oscillating cycle of shocks also seized the heart, causing it to go into arrest and stop beating. He often carried his own electrodes with him, including a head-piece made from a cut-down football helmet, lined with moist sponge. A keen gardener and a quiet family man, Elliott ran an electrical contracting business and claimed never to have been more than an instrument of the people when he performed an execution.

Despite his calling, he profoundly disagreed with capital punishment, saying that it served no useful purpose. In his memoirs, Elliott wrote "I hope that the day is not far distant when legal slaying, whether by electrocution, hanging, lethal gas, or any other method is outlawed throughout the United States."

He executed 387 people, including Sacco and Vanzetti, Ruth Snyder, Irene Schroeder and Bruno Hauptmann. On January 6, 1927, he carried out the electrocutions of six inmates in two states. Soon after the execution of Sacco and Vanzetti, persons unknown planted a bomb under his house that destroyed his front porch. For some time later, the State of New York paid for a 24-hour guard.

=== Memoirs and death ===
He published his experiences in a book entitled Agent of Death. Shortly after the executions, a newspaper reported that Elliott was haunted by what he had done, and that the specter of Ruth Snyder bedeviled him. It was reported that Elliott required sedation to sleep, and that he was paralyzed with guilt. However, in Agent of Death, Elliott wrote that he was affected by the necessity of electrocuting a woman, but he was not the type of man to lose sleep over having done his job. In the foreword to his memoirs, his co-author, A. R. Beatty commented that Elliott had just approved the final chapters of the book before dying after a short illness.

Elliott died of coronary embolism and he is buried in the Nassau Knolls Cemetery, Port Washington, New York.

== See also ==
- List of executioners
- List of people executed in New York
