= Electric chair =

Execution method

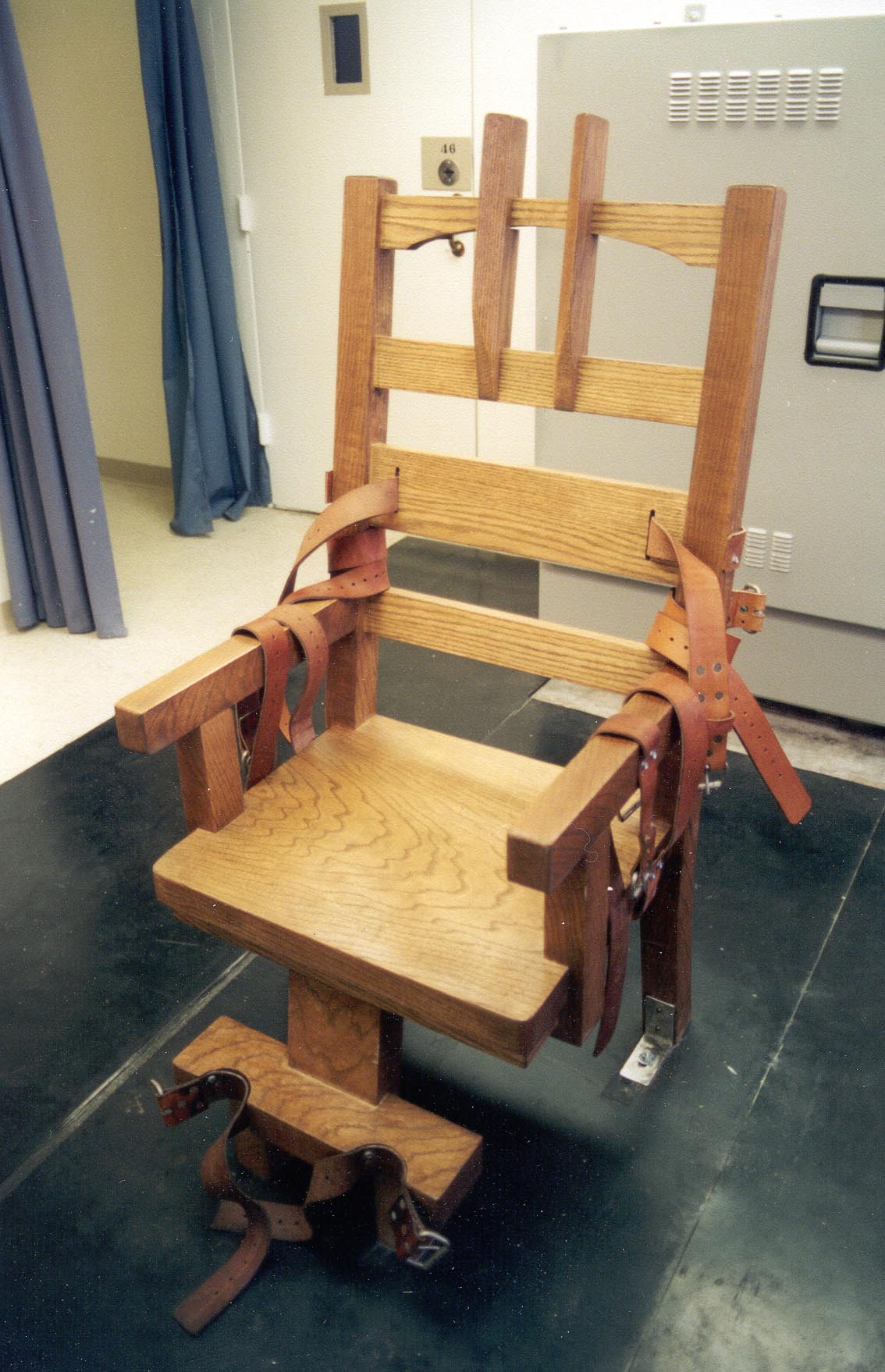
Electric chair at the Florida State Prison

An electric chair (also known as an electrical chair or execution chair) is a specialized device used for execution through electrocution. The condemned prisoner is strapped to a custom wooden chair and electrocuted via electrodes attached to the head and legs. Alfred P. Southwick, a dentist in Buffalo, New York, conceived this execution method in 1881. It was developed over the next decade, promoted by Southwick as a more humane alternative to conventional executions, particularly hanging. First used in 1890, the electric chair has become a symbol of capital punishment in the United States.

The electric chair was once thought to cause death through cerebral damage, but it was scientifically established in 1899 that death primarily results from ventricular fibrillation and cardiac arrest. It became a common method of capital punishment in the United States and also extensively in the Philippines, but its use has substantially declined with the adoption of lethal injection which was perceived as more humane and more practical.

As of 2026, electrocution is a legal method of capital punishment in the following U.S. states:

- Alabama: as a choice between the default lethal injection, nitrogen hypoxia, and electrocution (see Capital punishment in Alabama).
- Florida: as a choice between the default lethal injection and electrocution (see Capital punishment in Florida).
- Kentucky: only as a choice between the default lethal injection and electrocution for inmates sentenced before March 31, 1998, of which there are only fifteen remaining; or if lethal injection is found to be unconstitutional (see Capital punishment in Kentucky).
- Louisiana: decided by the secretary of the Department of Public Safety and Corrections out of lethal injection, nitrogen hypoxia, and electrocution (see Capital punishment in Louisiana).
- Mississippi: decided by the commissioner of the Department of Corrections out of the preferred lethal injection, nitrogen hypoxia, firing squad, and electrocution (see Capital punishment in Mississippi).
- Oklahoma: to be used only as a method if prior methods in the order of the default lethal injection, and then nitrogen hypoxia are unavailable or found to be unconstitutional (see Capital punishment in Oklahoma).
- South Carolina: as the default method with lethal injection and firing squad only as a choice by the inmate (see Capital punishment in South Carolina).
- Tennessee: as a choice between the default lethal injection and electrocution for inmates sentenced before January 1, 1999, or if lethal injection is unavailable or found to be unconstitutional (see Capital punishment in Tennessee).

== Background ==
=== Invention ===
In the late 1870s to early 1880s, the introduction of arc lighting, a type of outdoor street lighting that required high voltages in the range of 3000–6000 volts, was followed by multiple stories in newspapers about how the high voltages used were killing people, usually unwary linemen; it was seen as a strange new phenomenon that seemed to instantaneously strike a victim dead without leaving a mark. One of these accidents, in Buffalo, New York, on August 7, 1881, led to the inception of the electric chair. That evening, a drunken dock worker named George Lemuel Smith, looking for the thrill of a tingling sensation he had noticed when grabbing the guard rail in a Brush Electric Company arc lighting power house, managed to sneak his way back into the plant at night and grabbed the brush and ground of a large electric dynamo, and died instantly. The coroner who investigated the case brought it up that year at a local Buffalo scientific society. Another member attending that lecture, Alfred P. Southwick, a dentist who had a technical background, thought some application could be found for the curious phenomenon.

Southwick joined physician George E. Fell and the head of the Buffalo ASPCA in a series of experiments electrocuting hundreds of stray dogs. They ran trials with the dog in and out of water, and varied the electrode type and placement until they came up with a repeatable method to euthanize animals using electricity. Southwick went on in the early 1880s to advocate that this method be used as a more humane replacement for hanging in capital punishment cases, coming to national attention when he published his ideas in scientific journals in 1882 and 1883. He worked out calculations based on the dog experiments conducted, trying to develop a scaled-up method that would work on humans. Early on in his designs, he adopted a modified version of the dental chair as a way to restrain the condemned, a device that from then on would be called the electric chair.

==== Gerry Commission ====
After a series of botched hangings in the United States, there was mounting criticism of that form of capital punishment and the death penalty in general. In 1886, newly elected New York State governor David B. Hill set up a three-member death penalty commission, which was chaired by the human rights advocate and reformer Elbridge Thomas Gerry and included New York lawyer and politician Matthew Hale and Southwick, to investigate a more humane way of executing condemned criminals.

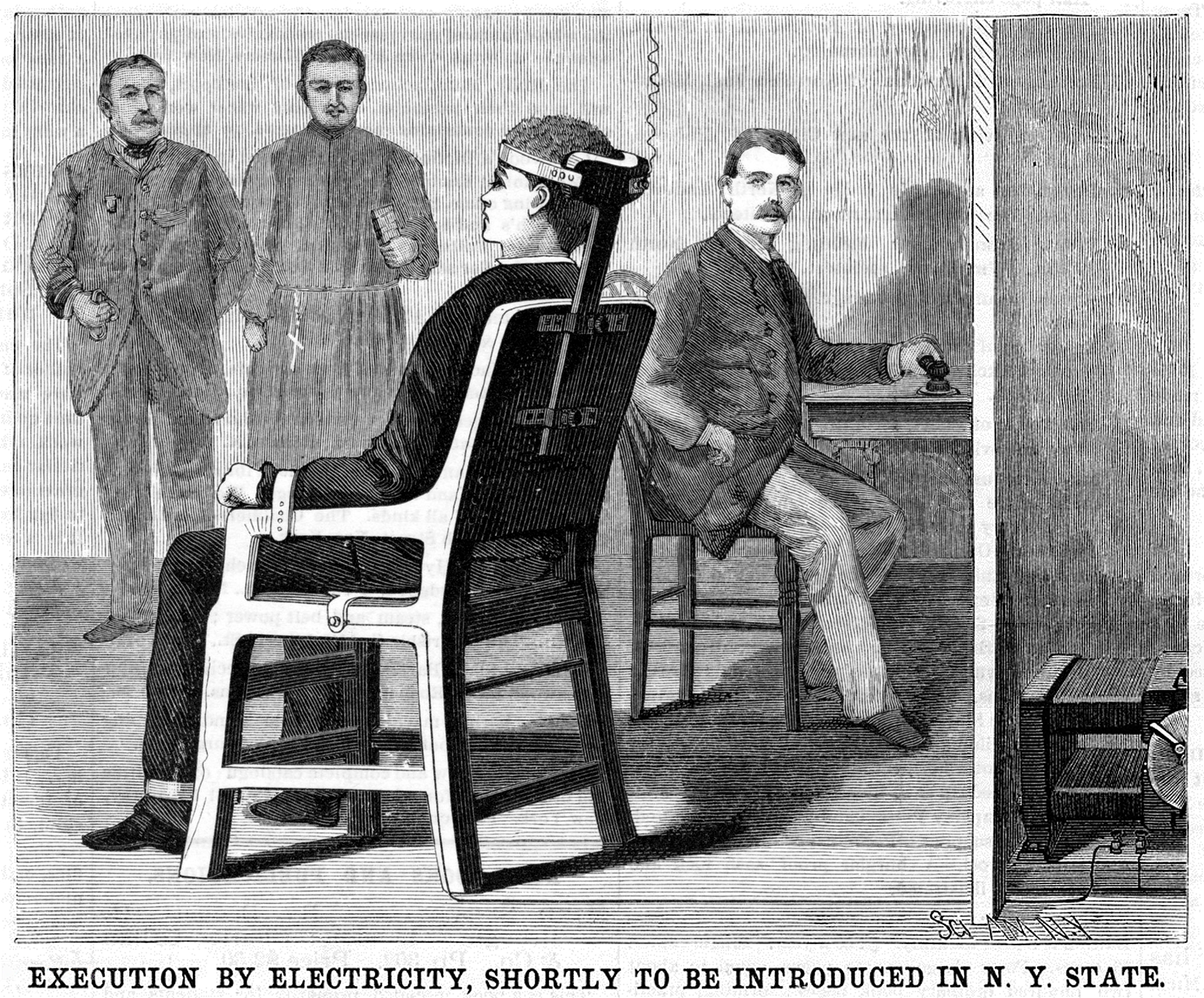
A June 30, 1888, Scientific American illustration of what the electric chair suggested by the Gerry Commission might look like.

The commission members surveyed the history of execution and sent out a fact-finding questionnaire to government officials, lawyers, and medical experts all around the state asking for their opinion. A slight majority of respondents recommended hanging over electrocution, with a few instead recommending the abolition of capital punishment. The commission also contacted electrical experts, including Thomson-Houston Electric Company's Elihu Thomson (who recommended high voltage AC connected to the head and the spine) and the inventor Thomas Edison (who also recommended AC, as well as using a Westinghouse generator). They also attended electrocutions of dogs by George Fell who had worked with Southwick in the early 1880s experiments. Fell was conducting further experiments, electrocuting anesthetized vivisected dogs trying to discern exactly how electricity killed a subject.

In 1888, the Commission recommended electrocution using Southwick's electric chair idea with metal conductors attached to the condemned person's head and feet. They further recommended that executions be handled by the state instead of the individual counties with three electric chairs set up at the Auburn, Clinton, and Sing Sing prisons. A bill following these recommendations passed the legislature and was signed by Governor Hill on June 4, 1888, set to go into effect on January 1, 1889.

==== New York Medico-Legal Commission ====
The bill itself contained no details on the type or amount of electricity that should be used and the New York Medico-Legal Society, an informal society composed of doctors and lawyers, was given the task of determining these factors. In September 1888, a committee was formed and recommended 3000 volts, although the type of electricity, direct current (DC) or alternating current (AC), was not determined, and since tests up to that point had been done on animals smaller than humans (dogs), some members were unsure that the lethality of AC had been conclusively proven to be effective.

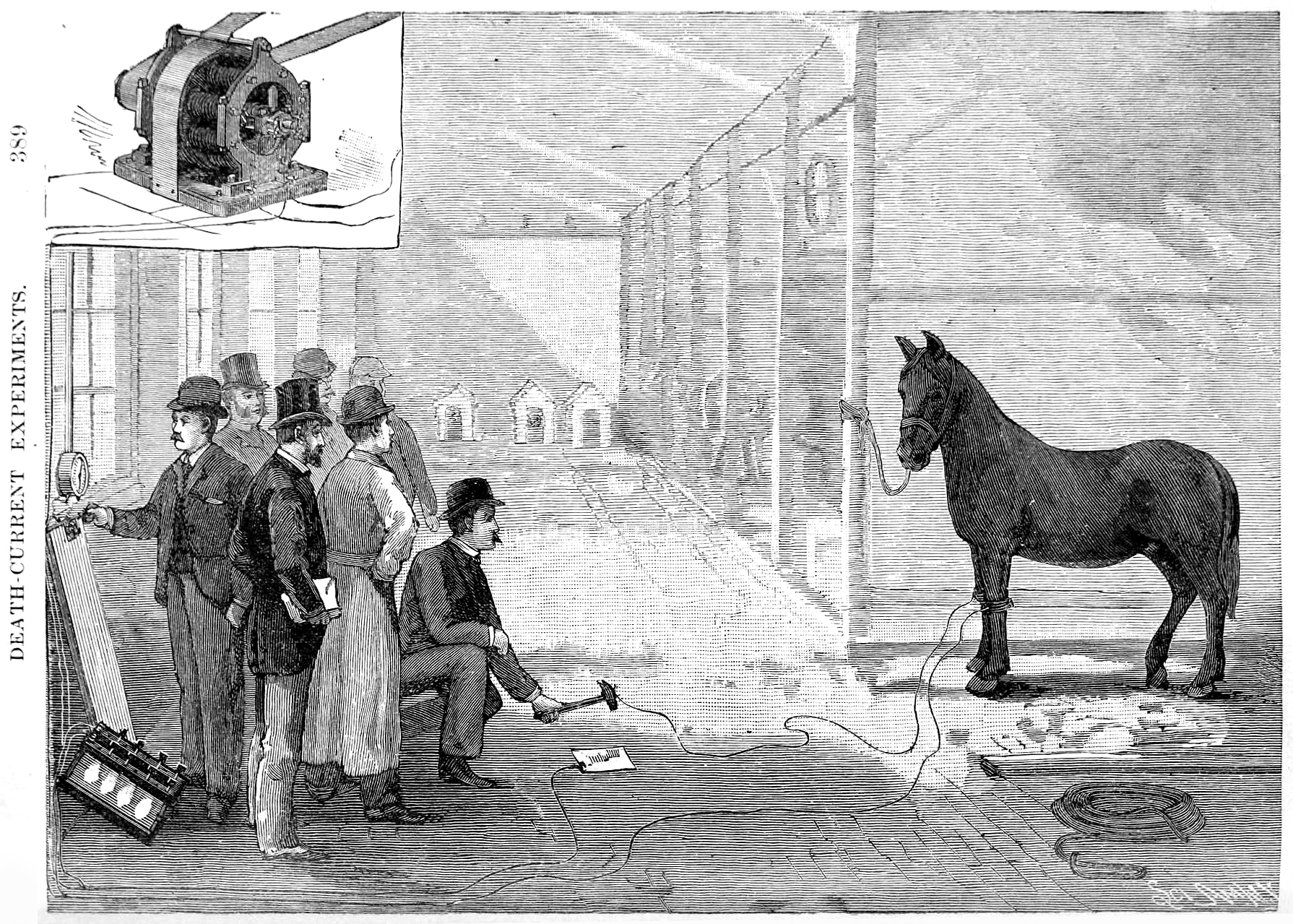
Harold Brown demonstrating the killing power of AC to the New York Medico-Legal Society by electrocuting a horse at Thomas Edison's West Orange laboratory.

At this point, the state's efforts to design the electric chair became intermixed with what has come to be known as the war of the currents, a competition between Thomas Edison's direct current power system and George Westinghouse's alternating current based system. The two companies had been competing commercially since 1886 and a series of events had turned it into an all-out media war in 1888. The committee head, neurologist Frederick Peterson, enlisted the services of Harold P. Brown as a consultant. Brown had been on his own crusade against alternating current after the shoddy installation of pole-mounted AC arc lighting lines in New York City had caused several deaths in early 1888. Peterson had been an assistant at Brown's July 1888 public electrocution of dogs with AC at Columbia College, an attempt by Brown to prove AC was more deadly than DC. Technical assistance in these demonstrations was provided by Thomas Edison's West Orange laboratory and there grew to be some form of collusion between Edison Electric and Brown. Back at West Orange on December 5, 1888, Brown set up an experiment with members of the press, members of the Medico-Legal Society including Elbridge Gerry who was also chairman of the death penalty commission, and Thomas Edison looking on. Brown used alternating current for all of his tests on animals larger than a human, including 4 calves and a lame horse, all dispatched with 750 volts of AC. Based on these results the Medico-Legal Society recommended the use of 1000–1500 volts of alternating current for executions and newspapers noted the AC used was half the voltage used in the power lines over the streets of American cities. Westinghouse criticized these tests as a skewed self-serving demonstration designed to be a direct attack on alternating current and accused Brown of being in the employ of Edison.

At the request of death penalty commission chairman Gerry, Medico-Legal Society members; electrotherapy expert Alphonse David Rockwell, Carlos Frederick MacDonald, and Columbia College professor Louis H. Laudy, were given the task of working out the details of electrode placement. They again turned to Brown to supply the technical assistance. Brown asked Edison Electric Light to supply equipment for the tests and treasurer Francis S. Hastings (who seemed to be one of the primary movers at the company trying to portray Westinghouse as a peddler of death dealing AC current) tried to obtain a Westinghouse AC generator for the test but found none could be acquired. They ended up using Edison's West Orange laboratory for the animal tests they conducted in mid-March 1889. Superintendent of Prisons Austin E. Lathrop asked Brown to design the chair, but Brown turned down the offer. George Fell drew up the final designs for a simple oak chair and went against the Medico-Legal Society recommendations, changing the position of the electrodes to the head and the middle of the back. Brown did take on the job of finding the generators needed to power the chair. He managed to surreptitiously acquire three Westinghouse AC generators that were being decommissioned with the help of Edison and Westinghouse's chief AC rival, the Thomson-Houston Electric Company, a move that made sure that Westinghouse's equipment would be associated with the first execution. The electric chair was built by Edwin F. Davis, the first "state electrician" (executioner) for the State of New York.

=== First execution ===
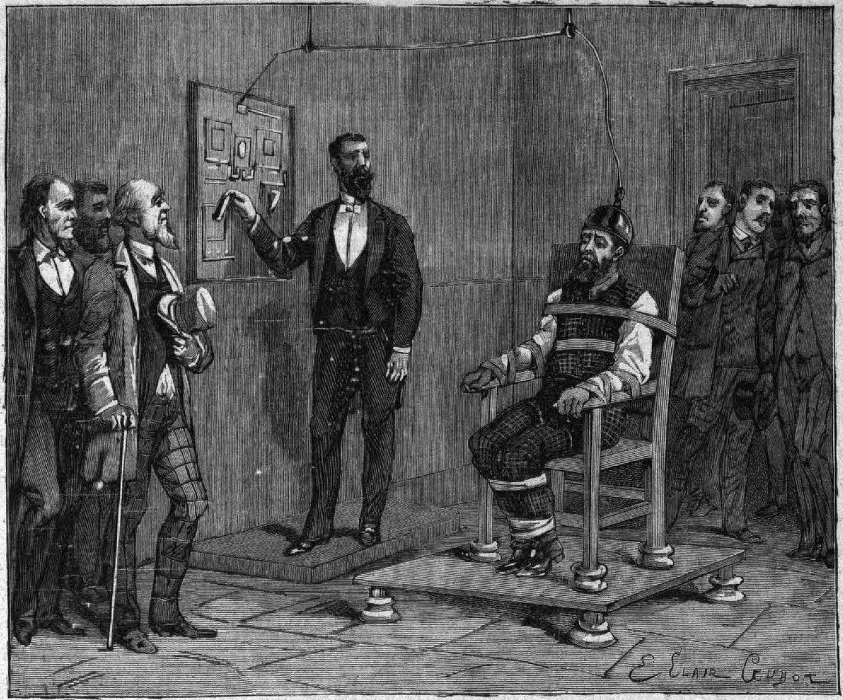
The execution of William Kemmler, August 6, 1890

The first person in line to die under New York's new electrocution law was Joseph Chapleau, convicted for beating his neighbor to death with a sled stake, but his sentence was instead commuted to life imprisonment. The next person scheduled to be executed was William Kemmler, convicted of murdering his wife with a hatchet. An appeal on Kemmler's behalf was made to the New York Court of Appeals on the grounds that use of electricity as a means of execution constituted a "cruel and unusual punishment" and was thus contrary to the constitutions of the United States and the state of New York. On December 30, 1889, the writ of habeas corpus sworn out on Kemmler's behalf was denied by the court, with Judge Dwight writing in a lengthy ruling:

We have no doubt that if the Legislature of this State should undertake to proscribe for any offense against its laws the punishment of burning at the stake, breaking at the wheel, etc., it would be the duty of the courts to pronounce upon such attempt the condemnation of the Constitution. The question now to be answered is whether the legislative act here assailed is subject to the same condemnation. Certainly, it is not so on its face, for, although the mode of death described is conceded to be unusual, there is no common knowledge or consent that it is cruel; it is a question of fact whether an electric current of sufficient intensity and skillfully applied will produce death without unnecessary suffering.

Kemmler was executed in New York's Auburn Prison on August 6, 1890; the "state electrician" was Edwin Davis. The first 17-second passage of 1,000 volts AC through Kemmler caused unconsciousness, but failed to stop his heart and breathing. The attending physicians, Edward Charles Spitzka and Carlos Frederick MacDonald, came forward to examine Kemmler. After confirming Kemmler was still alive, Spitzka reportedly called out, "Have the current turned on again, quick, no delay." The generator still needed time to recharge, however. In the second attempt, Kemmler received a 2,000 volt AC shock. Blood vessels under the skin ruptured and bled, and the areas around the electrodes singed; some witnesses reported that his body caught fire. The entire execution took about eight minutes. George Westinghouse later commented, "They would have done better using an axe", and The New York Times ran the headline "Far worse than hanging".

=== Adoption ===
The electric chair was adopted by Ohio (1897), Massachusetts (1900), New Jersey (1906), and Virginia (1908), and soon became the prevalent method of execution in the United States, replacing hanging. Twenty-six states, the District of Columbia, the federal government, and the U.S. military either had death by electrocution on the books or actively executed criminals using the method. The electric chair remained the most prominent execution method until the early 1990s, when it was downgraded to a backup method that an inmate could choose in several states, but was rarely used.

Other countries appear to have contemplated using the method, sometimes for special reasons. The Philippines also adopted the electric chair during its American colonial period, and used it from 1926 to 1987. A well-publicized triple execution took place there in May 1972, when Jaime Jose, Basilio Pineda, and Edgardo Aquino were electrocuted for the 1967 abduction and gang-rape of the young actress Maggie de la Riva. The last electric chair execution in the Philippines was in 1976, and it was later replaced with lethal injection when executions resumed in the country.

=== Key events in the United States ===
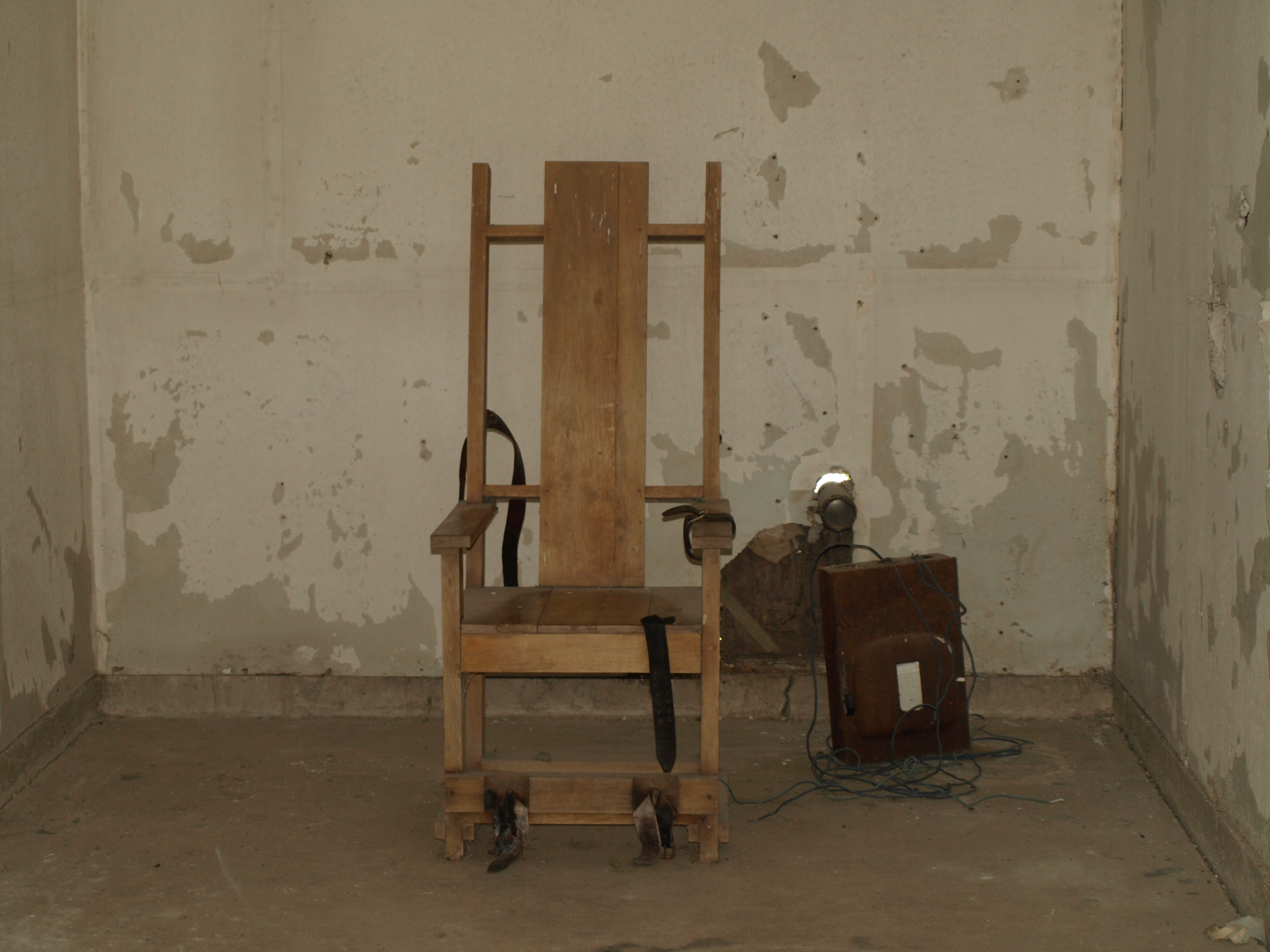
The former Louisiana execution chamber at the Red Hat Cell Block in the Louisiana State Penitentiary, West Feliciana Parish. The electric chair is a replica of the original.

Martha M. Place became the first woman executed in the electric chair at Sing Sing Prison on March 20, 1899, for the murder of her 17-year-old stepdaughter, Ida Place.

Leon Czolgosz was executed in the electric chair at New York's Auburn Prison on October 29, 1901, for the assassination of then-President William McKinley.

The first photograph of an execution by electric chair was of housewife Ruth Snyder at Sing Sing on the evening of January 12, 1928, for the March 1927 murder of her husband. It was photographed for a front-page story in the New York Daily News titled "DEAD!" the following morning by news photographer Tom Howard who had smuggled a camera into the death chamber and photographed her in the electric chair as the current was turned on. It remains one of the best-known examples of photojournalism.

A record was set on July 13, 1928, when seven men were executed consecutively in the electric chair at the Kentucky State Penitentiary in Eddyville, Kentucky.

On June 16, 1944, an African-American teenager, 14-year-old George Stinney, became the youngest person to be executed in the electric chair when he was electrocuted at the Central Correctional Institution in Columbia, South Carolina. His conviction was overturned in 2014 after a circuit court judge vacated his sentence on the grounds that Stinney did not receive a fair trial. The judge determined that Stinney's legal counsel was inadequate, thus violating his rights under the Sixth Amendment to the U.S. Constitution.

On May 3, 1946, an African-American teenager named Willie Francis became the first person known to have survived the electric chair in the Saint Martin Parish Prison in Saint Martinsville, Louisiana. In appeals, his trial was claimed to be unfair, violating his Fifth, Eighth, and Fourteenth Amendment rights under the U.S. Constitution. The appeals failed, and Francis was successfully electrocuted on May 9, 1947; he was 18.

On May 25, 1979, in Florida, John Spenkelink became the first person to be executed by the electric chair after the Gregg v. Georgia decision by the Supreme Court of the United States in 1976. He was the first person to be executed in the United States in this manner since 1966.

The last person to be executed by electric chair without the choice of an alternative method was Lynda Lyon Block on May 10, 2002, in Alabama.

The most recent execution by electric chair was of Nicholas Todd Sutton on February 20, 2020, in Tennessee.

== Process and mechanism ==
The condemned inmate's head and legs are shaved, before being led to the execution chamber. The condemned is then seated in the chair. Their arms and legs are tightly strapped with leather belts, and a cap with a saltwater-soaked sponge is strapped to the head, and electrodes are attached to the legs. The condemned person is optionally blindfolded or a bag is placed on their head.

Various cycles (changes in voltage and duration) of alternating current are passed through the individual's body in order to cause lethal damage to the internal organs. The first, more powerful electric shock (between 2,000 and 2,500 volts) is intended to cause immediate unconsciousness, ventricular fibrillation, and eventual cardiac arrest. The second, less powerful electric shock (500–1,500 volts) is intended to cause lethal damage to the vital organs.

After the cycles are completed, the prison officials wait approximately 5 minutes for the body to cool down. After those minutes pass, a doctor checks the inmate for any signs of life. If none are present, the doctor reports and records the time of death, which then involves removing the body and preparing it for an autopsy. If the inmate exhibits signs of life, the doctor notifies the warden, who will usually order another round of an electric current or may postpone the execution to a later date.

== Controversies and criticisms ==
=== Possibility of consciousness and pain during execution ===
Critics of the electric chair dispute whether the first jolt of electricity reliably induces immediate unconsciousness as proponents often claim.

=== Botched executions ===
The electric chair has been criticized because of several instances in which the subjects were killed only after being subjected to multiple electric shocks. This led to a call for ending of the practice, as being a "cruel and unusual punishment". Trying to address such concerns, Nebraska introduced a new electrocution protocol in 2004, which called for the administration of a 15-second application of current at 2,450 volts; after a 15-minute wait, an official then checks for signs of life. In April 2007, new concerns raised regarding the 2004 protocol resulted in the ushering in of a different Nebraska protocol, calling for a 20-second application of current at 2,450 volts. Prior to the 2004 protocol change, an initial eight-second application of current at 2,450 volts was administered, followed by a one-second pause, then a 22-second application at 480 volts. After a 20-second break, the cycle was repeated three more times.

In 1946, the electric chair failed to kill Willie Francis, who reportedly shrieked, "Take it off! Let me breathe!", after the current was applied. It turned out that the portable electric chair had been improperly set up by an intoxicated prison guard and inmate. A case was brought before the U.S. Supreme Court (Louisiana ex rel. Francis v. Resweber), with lawyers for the condemned arguing that although Francis did not die, he had, in fact, been executed. The argument was rejected on the basis that re-execution did not violate the double jeopardy clause of the 5th Amendment of the United States Constitution, and Francis was returned to the electric chair and executed in 1947.

Florida saw three highly controversial botched electrocutions in the 1990s, starting with the 1990 execution of Jesse Tafero. His case generated significant controversy, as with the first administration of electricity, Tafero's face and head caught fire. Tafero's execution ultimately required three shocks over the course of seven minutes. The error was blamed on prison officials replacing Florida's old natural sea sponge with a kitchen sponge. The 1997 execution of Pedro Medina in Florida created controversy when flames burst from his head. An autopsy found that Medina had died instantly when the first surge of electricity had destroyed his brain and brain stem. A judge ruled that the incident arose from "unintentional human error" rather than any faults in the "apparatus, equipment, and electrical circuitry" of Florida's electric chair. In Florida, on July 8, 1999, Allen Lee Davis, convicted of murder, was executed. Davis' face was bloodied, and photographs were taken, which were later posted on the Internet. An investigation concluded that Davis had begun bleeding before the electricity was applied and that the chair had functioned as intended. Florida's Supreme Court ruled that the electric chair did not constitute "cruel and unusual punishment".

== Decline and current status ==
The use of the electric chair has declined since the 1982 advent of lethal injection, which is now the default method in all U.S. jurisdictions that authorise capital punishment.

Pennsylvania replaced the electric chair with lethal injection as the state's only execution method in 1990, making Elmo Lee Smith, who was put to death on April 2, 1962, for the 1959 murder and rape of a 16-year-old girl, the last inmate executed by electrocution in the Commonwealth of Pennsylvania.

Indiana's electric chair, nicknamed "Old Betsy", was replaced in 1995 with lethal injection as the state's sole execution method, making Gregory Resnover, who was executed for the murder of a police officer on December 8, 1994, the last prisoner to die on the electric chair in Indiana.

On August 15, 2008, the Nebraska Supreme Court declared execution by electrocution to be "cruel and unusual punishment" prohibited by the Nebraska Constitution.

The last judicial electrocution in the U.S. prior to Furman v. Georgia took place in Oklahoma in 1966. The electric chair was used quite frequently in post-Gregg v Georgia executions during the 1980s, but its use in the United States gradually declined in the 1990s due to the widespread adoption of lethal injection. A number of states still allow the condemned person to choose between electrocution and lethal injection, with the most recent U.S. electrocution, of Nicholas Todd Sutton, taking place in February 2020 in Tennessee.

In 2021, South Carolina's governor Henry McMaster passed a law allowing electrocution, along with the default lethal injection or a firing squad. In 2022, a judge in Richland County declared that the firing squad and electrocution were both in violation of the South Carolina State Constitution, which bans methods that are "cruel, unusual, or corporal." The court, in their decision, stated that there was no evidence that electrocution could instantaneously or painlessly kill an inmate, writing that the idea of the electric chair inducing instant unconsciousness was based on "underlying assumptions upon which the electric chair is based, dating back to the 1800s, [that] have since been disproven." The decision also called electrocution "inconsistent with both the concepts of evolving standards of decency and the dignity of man", and stated, "Even if an inmate survived only fifteen or thirty seconds, he would suffer the experience of being burned alive—a punishment that has 'long been recognized as manifestly cruel and unusual.'" The ruling led to a permanent injunction being issued against both methods of execution, preventing the state from subjecting death row inmates to death by firing squad or electrocution. In July 2024, the Supreme Court of South Carolina ruled that electrocution and the firing squad were legal.

On March 5, 2024, Louisiana Governor Jeff Landry signed a law reintroducing electrocution as a method of execution and also allowing executions to be carried out via nitrogen hypoxia.

== See also ==
- List of people executed by electrocution

Nicknames of various electric chairs

- Gruesome Gertie
- Old Smokey
- Old Sparky
- Yellow Mama

State electricians

- New York State Electrician
- John Hulbert
- Robert G. Elliott
- Joseph Francel
- Dow Hover

== Works cited ==
- Brandon, Craig (2016). The Electric Chair: An Unnatural American History. McFarland & Company. p. 14. ISBN 9780786451012.
