= Carlos Frederick MacDonald =

American physician

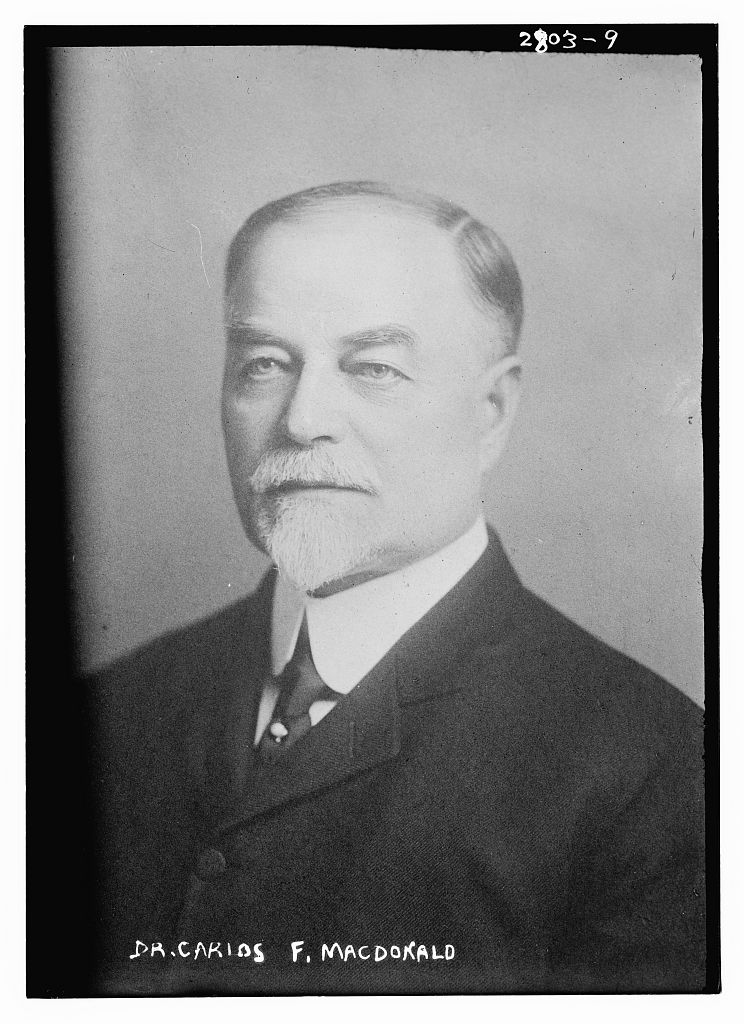
- MacDonald circa 1915

President of the American Psychiatric Association
- In office 1913–1914
- Preceded by: James C. Searcy
- Succeeded by: Samuel E. Smith

Personal details
- Born: August 29, 1845 Niles, Ohio
- Died: May 29, 1926 (aged 80) Central Valley, New York

Carlos Frederick MacDonald, M.D. (August 29, 1845 – May 29, 1926) was a psychiatrist, and the chairman of the New York State Commission in Lunacy from 1880 to 1896. He was involved in the design of the first electric chair and examined Leon F. Czolgosz, pronouncing him sane enough to be executed in the electric chair after the assassination of President William McKinley in 1901. He was President of the American Psychiatric Association from 1913 to 1914. He was an expert witness at the trials of Harry Thaw and Harrison W. Noel.

== Biography ==
MacDonald was born in Niles, Ohio, and attended the local schools. At age 16, he enlisted in the Sixth Ohio Volunteer Cavalry during the American Civil War participating in several battles including Antietam and Gettysburg. After the war, he spent a year in high school and then entered the Bellevue Hospital Medical College in New York City. He earned his M.D. in 1869. He interned at both the Kings County Hospital in Brooklyn, New York City, and at a smallpox hospital during an epidemic for fifteen months.

In 1873 he became superintendent of Flatbush Insane Asylum.

In 1876, he was appointed superintendent of the State Asylum for the Criminally Insane in Auburn, New York. He then managed the New York State Inebriate Asylum in Binghamton, New York. He remained in both Auburn and Binghamton until 1880.

In 1880, the New York State Legislature passed the State Care Act which provided for the removal of all insane persons from almshouses, county asylums, and workhouses to state mental hospitals. The act established a commission which included a psychiatrist president and two lay members and was charged to be responsible for the state mental hospitals. MacDonald was appointed as the president and held the position until 1896 when he resigned in protest of the commission to carry out its responsibilities which were seen by the state hospital superintendents as a threat to their autonomy.

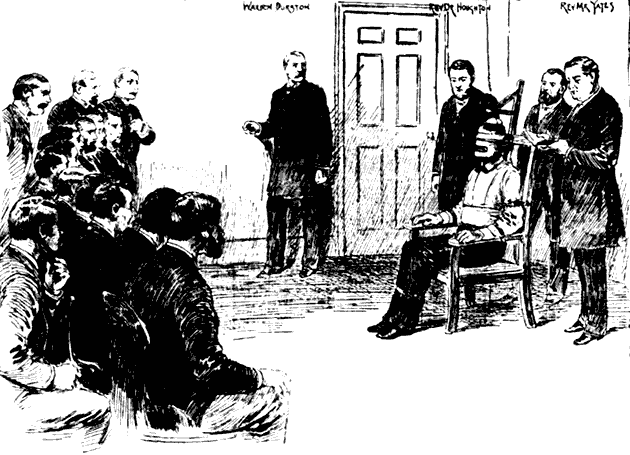
The execution of William Kemmler.

MacDonald, as a member of the New York Medico-Legal Society, worked on the development of the first electric chair, specifically working with other Society members on the composition and placement of electrode on the condemned prisoner. He was also an attending physician at the execution of William Kemmler in New York's Auburn Prison on August 6, 1890, the first execution using the electric chair.

He was a professor of mental diseases at the Bellevue Hospital Medical College from 1888 to 1896 and a lecturer at the Albany Medical College from 1892 to 1894. In 1901, MacDonald was asked to examine Leon Czolgosz who had assassinated President McKinley. MacDonald found the prisoner sane and attended Czolgosz’s execution in the electric chair. He attended the autopsy and published his findings in a report. In 1906, MacDonald purchased a private mental hospital, Falkirk Sanatorium, in Central Valley, New York, which he operated for many years.

He was president of the American Medico-Psychological Association now the American Psychiatric Association from 1913 to 1914.

MacDonald died on May 29, 1926, in Central Valley, New York.

== Memberships ==
He was a member of the Grand Army of the Republic. He was a consulting physician at the Manhattan State Hospital. He was a member of the New York County Medical Society and the New York Medico-Legal Society.
