= New York State Electrician =

Chief executioner of New York State (1890–1972)

State Electrician of New York
- Seal of New York
- New York State Department of Corrections and Community Supervision
- Reports to: The warden of Sing Sing
- Appointer: The governor of New York
- Term length: Indeterminate
- Inaugural holder: Edwin Davis; 1890–1914
- Final holder: Dow Hover; 1953-1963
- Abolished: 1963 (de facto); 1972 (de jure)
- Salary: $150 per execution, plus $50 for any additional executions on the same day (from the 1920s up to 1963)

New York State Electrician was a euphemistic title given to the chief executioner of the State of New York during the use of the electric chair. The position existed from 1890 until the state's last execution in 1963, although the final State Electrician, Dow Hover, remained on call for any future executions until the United States Supreme Court briefly abolished capital punishment with its 1972 decision in Furman v. Georgia.

The State Electrician was contracted by the state at an unchanged rate of $150 per execution (with $50 added for any additional executions performed on the same day) for the duration of the position's existence. New York did not prohibit the officeholder from performing executions for other states or for the federal government, and such arrangements were common, with the New York State Electrician being retained to conduct notable executions such as that of Lindbergh baby killer Richard Hauptmann by the State of New Jersey, Sacco and Vanzetti by the Commonwealth of Massachusetts, and the Rosenbergs by the United States.

== List of New York state electricians ==
Name	Took office	Left office	Governors
Edwin Davis	August 6, 1890	1914	David B. Hill; Roswell P. Flower; Levi P. Morton; Frank S. Black; Theodore Roosevelt; Benjamin Odell Jr. Charles Evans Hughes; John Alden Dix; William Sulzer; Martin H. Glynn
John Hulbert	1914	January 29, 1926	Martin H. Glynn; Charles S. Whitman; Al Smith
Robert G. Elliott	January 29, 1926	August 24, 1939	Al Smith; Franklin D. Roosevelt; Herbert H. Lehman
Joseph Francel	August 24, 1939	August 5, 1953	Herbert H. Lehman; Thomas E. Dewey
Dow Hover	August 5, 1953	August 15, 1963 (de facto); June 29, 1972 (de jure)	Thomas E. Dewey; Averell Harriman; Nelson Rockefeller
