= 100 Diagrams That Changed the World =

Book by Scott Christianson

100 Diagrams That Changed The World: From The Earliest Cave Paintings to the Innovation of the iPod
- Author: Scott Christianson
- Publisher: Plume

100 Diagrams That Changed The World: From The Earliest Cave Paintings to the Innovation of the iPod is a book by journalist Scott Christianson. The book compiles 1000 diagrams throughout history considered by the author to be particularly influential.

== See also ==
- Diagrams and Explanations of the Wonderful Machines of the Far West
