= Dow Hover =

American executioner

Dow B. Hover (November 16, 1900 – June 1, 1990) was an American executioner who was the last person to serve as a New York State Electrician, the state's executioner and operator of the electric chair. He was the last person to serve as an executioner in the state, which has since abolished capital punishment. On August 15, 1963 at Sing Sing prison, Hover executed Eddie Lee Mays, the last person to be executed by the State of New York.

Hover, a native and lifelong resident of Germantown, worked as a deputy sheriff for Columbia County.

When on August 5, 1953, longtime state electrician Joseph Francel left his post after 14 years on service, Hover was hired to replace him, securing the job through his contacts at the Columbia County sheriff's office. He was 52 years old at that time and, like five of his predecessors, was a trained electrician. In addition to his work as a deputy sheriff, Hover earned $150 for each execution he did at Sing Sing prison, which was roughly 160 miles away from his usual place of work. Adjusted for inflation, his pay would be equivalent to $1,000 per execution. Hover also received travel reimbursement, usually eight cents per mile.

Unlike his predecessor, whose name regularly appeared in the media, Hover kept his second job a secret. On the nights he drove to Sing Sing to carry out an execution, he changed the license plates on his car before he even left his garage. Hover was a well-known citizen of Germantown, because of his primary position as a deputy sheriff.

In addition to many state executions during the administrations of Governors Thomas E. Dewey, W. Averell Harriman and Nelson Rockefeller, he executed gangster Gerhard Puff, a federal inmate. He also performed fourteen executions in New Jersey and was the executioner for six executions in Connecticut during the mid-1950s to early 1960s.

Hover was married at the age of 20 and had two children. He was the founder of a laboratory animal supply company, Taconic Farms, that he later sold. Hover held a General Class amateur radio license, since some time before 1969. His call sign was WA2QQY.

His later life was characterized by intense grief. He suffered frequent migraines, possibly as a result of job-related stress. Hover died of an apparent suicide by carbon monoxide poisoning inhalation on June 1, 1990, being found dead at his home garage while in his car with the engine running.

Execution Nights, a song about the life of Dow B. Hover was written and recorded by Canadian singer-songwriter, Lorne Clarke. The song was included on Clarke's 2007 CD release, Moonlight & Cider.
