= Joseph Francel =

American executioner (1895–1981)

- Born: September 2, 1895; Soudan, Minnesota, U.S.
- Died: January 25, 1981 (aged 85); Cairo, New York, U.S.
- Resting place: Cairo Cemetery
- Occupations: Electrician, Executioner
- Employer: New York State
- Known for: Executions of Julius and Ethel Rosenberg
- Title: State electrician
- Term: 1939–1953
- Predecessor: Robert G. Elliott
- Successor: Dow Hover

Joseph Francel (September 2, 1895 – January 25, 1981) was an American electrician from Cairo, New York, who was the state of New York's executioner from October 12, 1939 until 1953.

== Life and career ==
Francel was a father of two. Originally from St. Cloud, Minnesota, he was a World War I veteran, having served 16 months overseas as a sergeant in the United States Army.

His first execution was the triple electrocution of Anton Myslivec, Everett McDonald, and Theodore Maselkiewicz on December 21, 1939, in Sing Sing's death chamber. Among those he executed were Julius and Ethel Rosenberg. Like his predecessors, Francel also performed electrocutions in the neighboring states that used the electric chair as method of execution.

After the execution of William Draper, whom he had electrocuted in Sing Sing on July 23, 1953, Francel decided to quit his job.

At the time of his retirement in August 1953, The New York Times reported that Francel was discontent with his pay of $150 per execution, and that he was particularly exasperated about threats to his life.
