= Scott Christianson =

American author and journalist

- K. Scott Christianson
- Born: August 8, 1947
- Died: May 14, 2017; Great Barrington, Massachusetts
- Citizenship: American
- Writing career
- Pen name: Scott Christianson
- Period: 1965–2017
- Subjects: Social justice, history
- Notable awards: Pulitzer Prize nomination, 1969 to 1972

Keith (K.) Scott Christianson (August 8, 1947 – May 14, 2017) was an American author and journalist, who wrote several popular works about a variety of subjects, including American history and politics, forensic science, crime, prison and the death penalty, and about other popular subjects such as the history of incarceration, runaway slaves and historical highlights of visualization.

== Biography ==
Christianson was raised in New England and upstate New York, and graduated from Bethlehem Central High School in 1965. During his work he continued his studies. He graduated at the University of Connecticut, and took a course in investigative reporting at the American Press Institute. Eventually at the State University of New York at Albany he obtained his M.A. and in 1981 his PhD with the thesis, entitled The American Experience of Imprisonment, 1607–1776.

Christianson had begun his career after high school in 1965 in Albany, New York as investigating reporter at the Bethlehem Star and the Knickerbocker News-Union Star. In the 1980s he moved into the public service sector, where he held several positions in the criminal justice system in the state of New York. Later in the 1990s he worked for multiple advocacy and reform organizations, and eventually turned to full-time writing and teaching.

From 1969 to 1972 Christianson had been nominated for a Pulitzer Prize.

== Selected publications ==
- The American Experience of Imprisonment, 1607–1776, State University of New York at Albany, 1981.
- With Liberty for Some: 500 Years of Imprisonment in America, Northeastern, 1998.
- Condemned: Inside the Sing Sing Death House, NYU Press, 2000.
- Innocent: Inside Wrongful Conviction Cases, NYU, 2003.
- Notorious Prisons: Inside the World's Most Feared Institutions, The Lyons Press, 2004.
- Bodies of Evidence: Forensic Science and Crime, Collins and Brown, 2006.
- The Last Gasp: The Rise and Fall of the American Gas Chamber, University of California Press, 2010.
- 100 Diagrams That Changed the World, Plume, October 30, 2012.
- 100 Documents That Changed the World, Universe, Annotated edition, November 10, 2015.
- 100 Books that Changed the World, with Colin Salter, 2018.
