= John E. Gerin =

American physician (1849 – 1931)

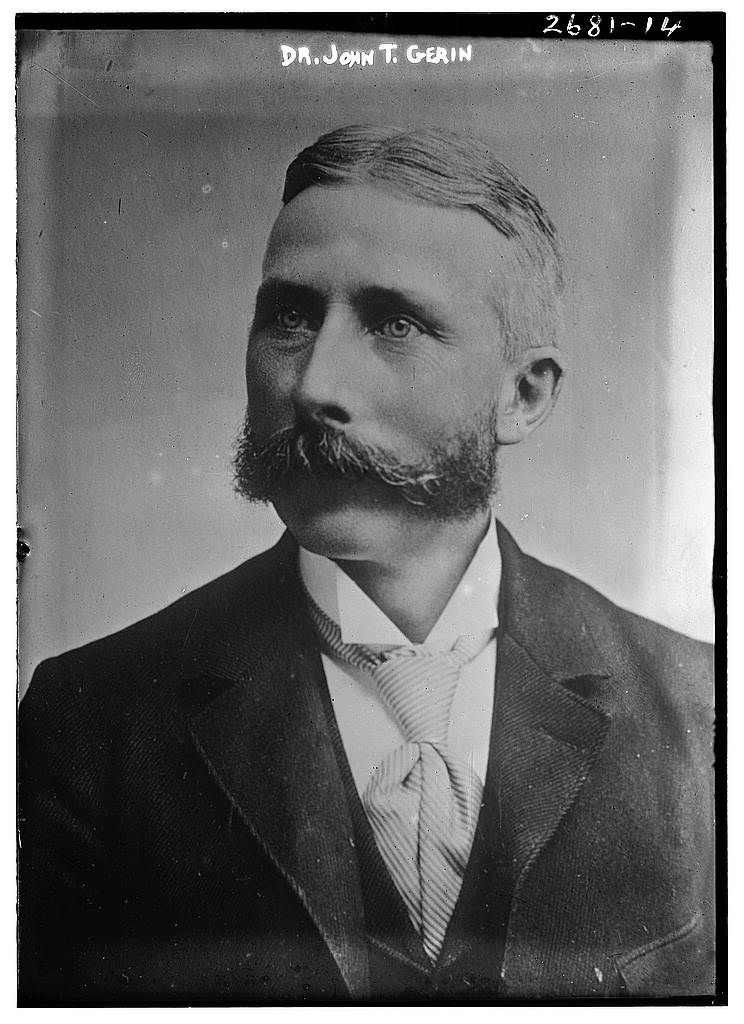
- Born: December 10, 1849; Cobourg, Canada West
- Died: February 15, 1931 (aged 81); Auburn, New York, U.S.
- Occupation: physician
- Known for: former physician of Auburn State Prison, New York

John E. Gerin M.D. (December 10, 1849 – February 15, 1931) was the physician at Auburn State Prison in Auburn, New York under warden George W. Benham. Gerin performed the autopsy on Leon Czolgosz.

== History ==
Gerin was born in Cobourg, Canada West in 1849 and attended Queen's University where he attained his M.D. In 1901 he performed the autopsy on Leon Czolgosz. In 1913 he was charged with brutality and indifference to suffering. He died at his home in Auburn in 1931 and is buried at St. Joseph's Cemetery.
