= Martha M. Place =

Executed American murderer

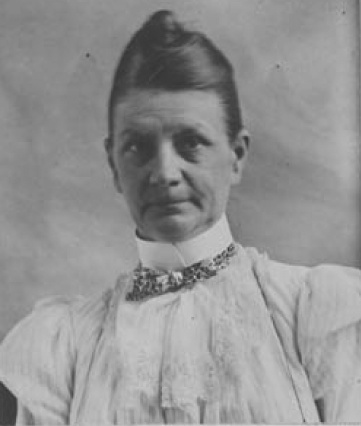
- Born: Martha M. Garretson; September 18, 1849; Readington Township, New Jersey, U.S.
- Died: March 20, 1899 (aged 49); Sing Sing Prison, New York, U.S.
- Spouse: William Place
- Status: Executed by electrocution
- Motive: Jealousy (alleged)
- Conviction: First degree murder
- Penalty: Death

Martha M. Place (September 18, 1849 – March 20, 1899) was an American murderer and the first woman to die in the electric chair. She was executed on March 20, 1899, at Sing Sing Correctional Facility for the murder of her 18-year-old stepdaughter Ida Place.

== Background ==
Martha Place was born Martha M. Garretson on September 18, 1849, in Readington Township, New Jersey, to Ellen (née Wyckoff) and Isaac V. N. Garretson. Place was struck in the head by a sleigh at age 23; her brother claimed that she never completely recovered and that the accident left her mentally unstable. Before relocating to New York, Place lived in New Jersey, working as a dressmaker. She married a man named Wesley Savacool and had a son, Ross Savacool. Wesley left the relationship when Ross was three and, finding herself in hardship, Martha gave Ross up for adoption to the Ashenbach family of Newark, who had recently lost a son. They renamed him William.

In 1893 Martha went to work as a housekeeper for a man named William W. Place, at 598 Hancock Street in Brooklyn, whom she married later that year.

Place had a daughter named Ida from a previous marriage. William married Martha to help him raise his daughter, although it was later rumored that Martha was jealous of Ida. William called the police at least once after his wife threatened to kill Ida.

=== Murder ===
On the evening of February 7, 1898, William Place arrived at his Brooklyn, New York, home and was attacked by Martha, who was wielding an axe. William escaped and ran for help. When the police arrived, they found Martha Place in critical condition. She was lying on the floor with clothes over her head and gas from burners was escaping into the room. Upstairs they discovered the body of 18-year-old Ida Place lying on a bed, blood coming from her mouth. William was an amateur photographer, which involved the use of acid, and the murderer had thrown this acid in Ida's eyes. The evidence later indicated Ida Place died from asphyxiation. Martha Place was hospitalized and arrested.

=== Trial ===
Place proclaimed her innocence while awaiting trial. One contemporary newspaper report described the defendant in this way:

She is rather tall and spare, with a pale, sharp face. Her nose is long and pointed, her chin sharp and prominent, her lips thin and her forehead retreating. There is something about her face that reminds one of a rat's, and the bright but changeless eyes somehow strengthen the impression.

Martha Place was found guilty of the murder of her stepdaughter Ida and sentenced to death. Her husband was a key witness against her.

=== Execution ===
The governor of the state of New York, Theodore Roosevelt, was asked to commute Place's death sentence, but he refused. Having never executed a woman in the electric chair, those responsible for carrying out the death warrant devised a new way to place the electrodes upon her, deciding to slit her dress and place the electrode on her ankle. Edwin F. Davis was the executioner. According to the reports of witnesses, she died instantly.

Martha Place was buried in the family cemetery plot in East Millstone, New Jersey, without religious observances.

Although Place was the first woman to die in the electric chair, she was the third to be sentenced to die by this method, the first two being serial killer Lizzie Halliday (1894 conviction commuted and sent to an asylum) and Maria Barbella (sentenced in 1895 and acquitted the next year).

== See also ==
- Capital punishment in the United States
- List of people executed in New York
