= William Kemmler =

American murderer (1860–1890)

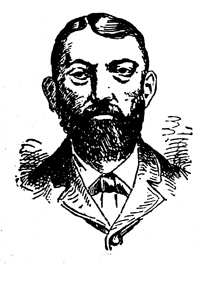
- Born: May 9, 1860; Philadelphia, Pennsylvania, U.S.
- Died: August 6, 1890 (aged 30); Auburn Prison, New York, U.S.
- Occupation: Produce merchant
- Spouse: Tillie Ziegler (common-law wife)
- Status: Executed by electric chair
- Conviction: First degree murder
- Penalty: Death

William Francis Kemmler (May 9, 1860 – August 6, 1890) was an American murderer who was the first person executed by electric chair. He was convicted of murdering Matilda "Tillie" Ziegler, his common-law wife, a year earlier. Although electrocution had previously been successfully used to kill a horse, Kemmler's execution did not go smoothly.

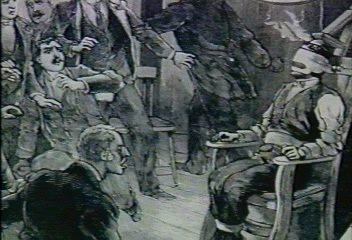
Eyewitness drawing of Kemmler's execution

== Early life ==
William Kemmler was born in Philadelphia, Pennsylvania, in 1860. Both of his parents were immigrants from Germany, and both were alcoholics. After dropping out of school at age 10, unable to read or write, Kemmler worked in his father's butcher shop. Kemmler's father died from an infection he received after a drunken brawl, and his mother from complications of alcoholism. In the late 1870s Kemmler was reportedly slender, with dark brown hair. He spoke both English and German.

After his parents' deaths, he went into the peddling business, and earned enough money to buy a horse and cart. At this point, however, he was also becoming a heavy drinker. In one episode involving him and his friends, after a series of drunken binges, he said he could jump his horse and cart over an eight-foot fence, with the cart attached to the horse. The attempt was a failure, and his cart and goods were destroyed in the incident. He was known to friends as "Philadelphia Billy", and his drinking binges were very well known around the saloons in his Buffalo neighborhood.

== Murder and execution ==
=== Murder, trial, and appeals ===
The New York Times described the murder:

William Kemmler was a vegetable peddler in the slums of Buffalo, New York. An alcoholic, on March 29, 1889, he was recovering from a drinking binge the night before when he became enraged with his girlfriend [elsewhere referred to as his common-law wife] Tillie Ziegler. He accused her of stealing from him and preparing to run away with a friend of his. When the argument reached a peak, Kemmler calmly went to the barn, grabbed a hatchet, and returned to the house. He struck Tillie repeatedly, killing her. He then went to a neighbor's house and announced he had just murdered his girlfriend.

The same day, Kemmler was accused of the murder of Matilda "Tillie" Ziegler, his common-law wife, who had been killed with a hatchet.

Kemmler's resulting murder trial proceeded quickly. He was convicted of first-degree murder on May 10. Three days later he was sentenced to death, destined to be the first person executed in an electric chair under New York's new execution law replacing hanging with electrocution. A chair was ready at the Auburn state prison. However, the leading developers of electrical power, including George Westinghouse, did not want to see their new product used in this manner. A lawyer filed an appeal claiming the electric chair violated the Eighth Amendment's prohibition of cruel and unusual punishment.

On January 1, 1888, New York had instituted death by electrocution, the first such law ever. After Kemmler's conviction, it was determined that his sentence was to be carried out at New York's Auburn Prison via the new electric chair, a device invented in 1881 by Buffalo, New York dentist Alfred Southwick. After nine years of development and legislation, the chair was considered ready for use. Kemmler's lawyers appealed, arguing that electrocution was a cruel and unusual punishment.

The plan to carry out Kemmler's execution via electric chair drew the situation into the AC/DC "war of the currents" between George Westinghouse, the largest supplier of alternating current equipment, and Thomas Edison, whose company ran its equipment on direct current. The alternating current that powered the electric chair (a current standard adopted by a committee after a demonstration performed at Edison's laboratory by anti-AC activist Harold P. Brown showing AC's lethality) was supplied by a Westinghouse generator surreptitiously acquired by Brown. This led to Westinghouse trying to stop what seemed to be Brown and Edison's attempt to try to portray the AC used in Westinghouse electrical system as the deadly "executioners' current", supporting Kemmler's appeal by hiring lawyer W. Bourke Cockran to represent him. The appeal failed on October 9, 1889, and the U.S. Supreme Court turned down the case, titled In re Kemmler, on the grounds that there was no cruel and unusual punishment in death by electrocution.

=== Execution ===
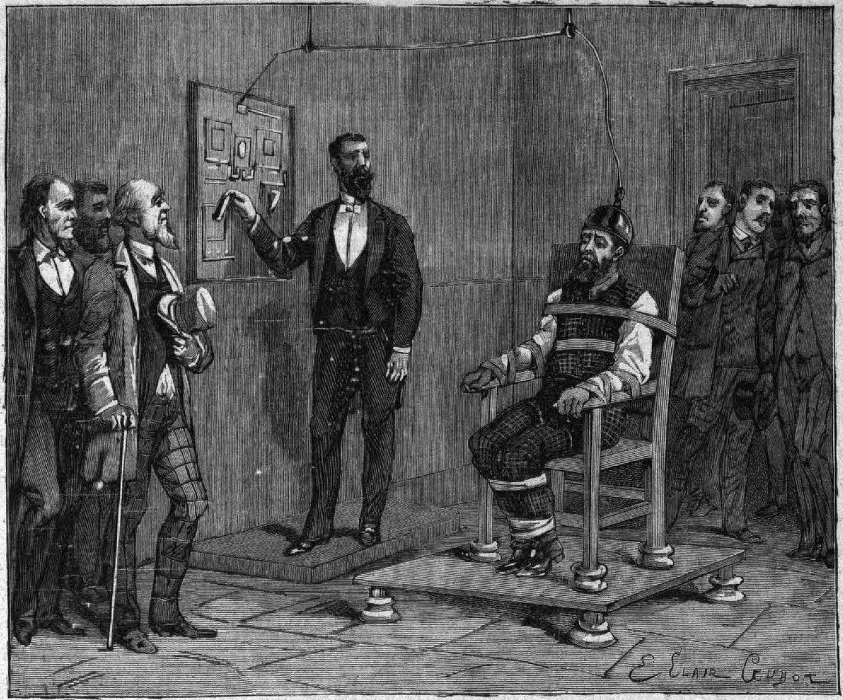
The execution of William Kemmler, August 6, 1890

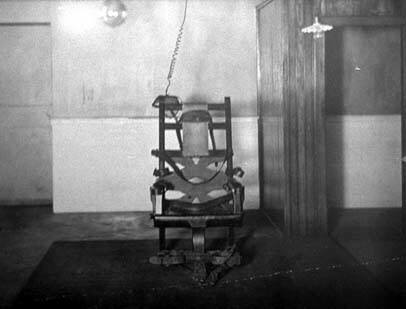
The electric chair in which Kemmler was executed on August 6, 1890

On the morning of his execution, August 6, 1890, Kemmler was awakened at 5:00 a.m. He dressed quickly and put on a suit, necktie, and white shirt. After breakfast and some prayer, the top of his head was shaved. At 6:38 a.m., Kemmler entered the execution room and warden Charles Durston presented Kemmler to the 17 witnesses in attendance. Kemmler looked at the chair and said: "Gentlemen, I wish you all good luck. I believe I am going to a good place, and I am ready to go."

Witnesses remarked that Kemmler was composed at his execution; he did not scream, cry, or resist in any way. He sat down on the chair, but was ordered to get up by the warden so a hole could be cut in his suit through which a second electrical lead could be attached. This was done and Kemmler sat down again. He was strapped to the chair, his face was covered and the metal restraint put on his bare head. He said, "Take it easy and do it properly, I'm in no hurry." Durston replied, "Goodbye, William" and ordered the switch thrown.

The generator was charged with 1,000 volts, which was thought to be adequate to induce quick unconsciousness and cardiac arrest. The chair had already been tested; a horse had been electrocuted the day before. Current passed through Kemmler for 17 seconds. The power was turned off and Kemmler was declared dead by Edward Charles Spitzka. Witnesses noticed Kemmler was still breathing. The attending physicians, Spitzka and Carlos Frederick MacDonald, came forward to examine Kemmler. After confirming he was still alive, Spitzka reportedly called out, "Have the current turned on again, quick—no delay."

In the second attempt, Kemmler was shocked with 2,000 volts. Blood vessels under his skin ruptured and bled, and some witnesses claimed his body caught fire. The New York Times reported instead that "an awful odor began to permeate the death chamber, and then, as though to cap the climax of this fearful sight, it was seen that the hair under and around the electrode on the head and the flesh under and around the electrode at the base of the spine was singeing. The stench was unbearable." Upon autopsy, doctors had found the blood vessels under the cap of his skull had carbonized and the top of the brain had hardened. Witnesses reported the smell of burning flesh and several nauseated spectators tried to leave the room.

The execution took approximately eight minutes and received substantial negative press from reporters covering it. The New York Times ran the headline: "Far Worse Than Hanging". Westinghouse later commented "They would have done better using an axe".

Kemmler is buried in the precincts of the prison where his execution took place.

== Media ==
- William Kemmler was shown as a wax figure seated in the electric chair in the 1953 movie House of Wax starring Vincent Price. Price's character does say they did not match Kemmler's face, but instead resembled co-star Charles Bronson.
- In 2017's The Current War, Conor MacNeill briefly portrayed Kemmler.
- In 2020's Tesla, Blake DeLong portrayed Kemmler on the day of his execution.

== See also ==
- Capital punishment in the United States
- List of botched executions
- List of people executed in New York
- List of people executed by electrocution

Preceded by new method	Executions carried out by electrocution	Succeeded by Harris Smiler
