= Edwin Davis (executioner) =

American executioner (1846–1923)

Edwin F. Davis
- Born: May 28, 1846
- Died: May 26, 1923 (aged 76)
- Known for: Executioner

Edwin F. Davis (May 28, 1846 – May 26, 1923), of Corning, Steuben County, New York, United States, was the first "state electrical engineer” (executioner) for the state of New York. In 1890, Davis finalized many features of the first electric chair used. Davis performed 240 executions between 1890 and 1914, including the first person to be executed by electric chair, William Kemmler, and the first woman, Martha M. Place, as well as William McKinley's assassin, Leon F. Czolgosz. He also performed executions in Massachusetts, Ohio, and New Jersey.

Davis held a patent on certain features of the electric chair. He received U.S. Patent No. 587,649 for his "Electrocution-Chair" on August 3, 1897.

He died in 1923, aged 76, and is buried in Barnard Cemetery in the town of Corning.

== See also ==
- List of executioners
