= Long Island serial killer =

Long Island serial killer may refer to:

- Gilgo Beach serial killings, a series of murders committed by serial killer Rex Heuermann between 1996 and 2011 in which the remains of 11 people were found on the South Shore of Long Island, New York
- Joel Rifkin (born 1959), an American serial killer sentenced for the murders of nine women between 1989 and 1993
- Robert Shulman (serial killer), who murdered five women between 1991 and 1996
- Richard Angelo, a serial killer who murdered at least four patients in 1987
- Richard Cottingham, a serial killer who murdered at least 18 women, four on Long Island
- Raymond Fernandez and Martha Beck, a serial killer couple who murdered a woman on Long Island in 1949
