= Raymond Fernandez =

Raymond Fernandez may refer to:

- Raymond Fernandez (serial killer) (1914–1951), American serial killer
- Hercules (wrestler) (1956–2004), Raymond Fernandez, American professional wrestler
