= Houston Roberts =

Executed American murderer and suspected serial killer

- Press photograph (c. 1949)
- Born: 1905; Hopewell, Mississippi, U.S.
- Died: March 21, 1951 (aged 45–46); Jackson, Mississippi, U.S.
- Status: Executed by electric chair
- Motive: Life insurance money
- Conviction: Murder
- Penalty: Death

Details
- Victims: 1–3
- Span of crimes: 1931–1949
- Country: United States
- State: Mississippi
- Date apprehended: October 22, 1949

Houston Roberts (1905 – March 21, 1951) was an American murderer and suspected serial killer who was convicted for poisoning his two granddaughters in 1949, one fatally. He also confessed to killing two of his wives in 1931 and 1933. He was never prosecuted for the former murders, but was sentenced to death for his granddaughter's murder. Roberts was subsequently executed in 1951, despite recanting his confession and claiming he was innocent.

== Murder of Mary Hill ==
At the time of the crimes, Roberts, an unemployed dairy herdsman, lived with his daughter Gladys and her family, who operated a boarding house in Jackson, Mississippi. He had previously been charged with passing bad checks in 1940, but after suffering an attack during the trial, he was remanded to the Mississippi State Hospital in Whitfield on January 13, 1940, where he underwent medical examinations. After spending twelve days in the hospital, Roberts was determined to be sane and released, with the charges against him dropped altogether.

On July 16, 1949, the elder of Roberts' granddaughters, 5-year-old Mary Louise Hill, was admitted to St. Dominic's Hospital due to multiple convulsions, to which she succumbed at the hospital. For unclear reasons, no post-mortem was done on the body, and she was quickly buried at the family plot in Hopewell. Suspicions were raised when the younger granddaughter, 4-year-old Shirley, was also admitted to the hospital in October, suffering from similar symptoms. While she managed to recover, an analysis of her urine determined that she had been poisoned with arsenic. This information was passed on to the police, who further discovered that both girls had life insurance policies issued on them in which their grandfather was the beneficiary. Due to these circumstances, Roberts was arrested on suspicion of murder, but he initially denied responsibility, claiming that he had used half of the policies to pay for Shirley's hospital bills. These claims were disproven after a check from the hospital, and after chemists from the Mississippi State University reported that an examination of five arsenic bottles determined that some of the arsenic had mysteriously vanished, Roberts was charged with capital murder and attempted murder.

== Confessions ==
Five days after his arrest, Roberts signed a written statement to Police Chief Joel Holden, in which he confessed that he had poisoned Mary and Shirley in order to collect the money from the life insurance policies, implicating a woman named Ruby Pace as his supposed accomplice. Following this revelation, the local coroners were tasked with exhuming Mary's body to test whether she had traces of arsenic, but the probe was temporarily suspended until they could produce a proper report on the results.

In the meantime, attorney Julian Alexander claimed to the press that Roberts had admitted to poisoning two of his wives with strychnine so he could collect $5,000 in life insurance policies from each. According to his confessions, Roberts had given his first wife Aletha Ainsworth some poisoned ice cream circa August 1931, while she lay pregnant at a hospital in Jackson. The second killing occurred sometime in 1933, when he had given strychnine capsules to his second wife Etta McRaney after she had returned from hospital to their home in Collins, where the family lived at the time. For unclear reasons, Roberts refused to make written statements about these confessions but supposedly claimed they were true. Despite this, Roberts was never charged with either case, presumably due to lack of evidence.

== Trial, imprisonment and execution ==
On November 21, a grand jury was selected for the upcoming murder trial. At one of the pre-trial hearings, Roberts' court-appointed attorney, Forrest Jackson, claimed that his client had told him that he had made the confession when he was "tired", a notion supported by his daughter, who believed that he was innocent. As a result, Jackson requested that the confession be thrown out on the grounds that Roberts was questioned without a warrant, but his request was denied by Justice Harold Cox, who ruled that the admission could be used at the trial.

On December 11, 1949, Roberts was found guilty and sentenced to death, but appeared seemingly unmoved by when the verdict was announced. At the time of the trial, the press compared him with another defendant in an unrelated murder case, focusing on Roberts' lackluster education and low IQ of 73, stating that he represented one of two extremes of a murder defendant. Following an appeal lodged by his lawyers to the Supreme Court of Mississippi, Roberts' initial execution date was stayed. In the end, however, the verdict was upheld, and Roberts' death sentence was finalized.

On March 17, 1951, several days before his scheduled execution, Roberts attempted suicide by slashing his wrists with a razor blade he had hidden in his shoe. The injuries proved to be superficial, and from then on, he was kept in a straitjacket to prevent him from further harming himself. Four days later, on March 21, he was executed at a prison in Jackson in the state's portable electric chair. Before the procedure had begun, he had spent the day mostly praying with the prison chaplain and other inmates and repeatedly reiterated that he was innocent. As he was strapped to the chair, his final words were, "Well now, bye bye." His execution came as a huge disappointment for the surviving family members, who hoped for a last-minute reprieve from Governor Fielding L. Wright, which never came.

== See also ==
- Capital punishment in Mississippi
- List of people executed in the United States in 1951
- List of people executed by electrocution
