= John M. Dunn =

Gangster

John Dunn
- Born: August 24, 1910; Queens, New York, U.S.
- Died: July 7, 1949 (aged 38); Sing Sing Prison, New York, U.S.
- Status: Executed by electrocution
- Conviction: First degree murder
- Penalty: Death

John M. "Cockeye" Dunn (August 24, 1910 – July 7, 1949) was a New York mobster who was involved in the numbers racket and labor racketeering as a top enforcer for his brother-in-law, Eddie McGrath. He was convicted, together with Andrew "Squint" Sheridan, of the 1947 murder of Greenwich Village hiring stevedore Anthony "Andy" Hintz, and executed by electric chair on July 7, 1949, aged 38.

== Early life ==
John M. Dunn was the first child born to Irish emigrant parents, Tom and Kitty Dunn, who left Ireland in the early 1900s and settled in Queens, New York City, New York. He was in and out of Catholic reform schools after the death of his father, a sailor in the Merchant Marine who was lost at sea when Dunn was four.

== Criminal career ==
With arrests for robbery and assault during his teenage years, Dunn was finally convicted of robbing a card game and sentenced to two years imprisonment at Sing Sing Prison. Following his release, Dunn was hired as an enforcer for McGrath who was then a part owner of Varick Enterprises, a front company which made collections for the waterfront dock bosses of Manhattan's West Side. In 1937, he and McGrath were arrested in connection with the death of a trucker but the charges were eventually dismissed for lack of evidence.

Later he formed a labor union (Local 21510, Motor and Bus Terminal Checkers, Platform and Office Workers) associated with the American Federation of Labor (AFL) and eventually oversaw waterfront racketeering on Manhattan's Lower West Side by the early 1940s. He established underworld connections including Joseph P. Ryan, who had sponsored him for union membership, and Meyer Lansky who had been in discussions regarding the use of the longshoremen's union to assist in the importation of heroin and cocaine into the United States.

During World War 2, Dunn was involved with Operation Underworld, a project that involved cooperation between the US government and the American mafia in securing the ports and waterfronts from sabotage, espionage, and other threats. On the orders of Lucky Luciano, Meyer Lansky contacted Dunn in order to bring the ILA into the operation. After being put in contact with the Office of Naval Intelligence (ONI), Dunn was brought into the mix and given an ONI code number. Dunn obtained union credentials for ONI agents and allowed them to pose as ILA workers.

== Hintz case ==
At 7:40 a.m. on January 8, 1947, Andrew "Andy" Hintz, hiring boss on Pier Fifty-One, was shot six times on the stairs just outside his apartment when leaving for work. He survived the attack and was taken to St. Vincent's Hospital, where he drifted in and out of consciousness for three weeks before his death on January 29. Before having been taken to the hospital he had told his wife that he had been shot by John Dunn. Dunn was arrested immediately and held as a material witness. On January 11, Hintz identified Dunn, Andy Sheridan and another man as his assailants in a dying declaration. Two days later, he made another dying declaration because in the first one he did not express clearly enough his belief that he was going to die.

On January 24, the police arrested Andrew "Squint" Sheridan at his home in Hollywood, Florida. He was transferred to New York by the FBI on a federal charge and later turned over to the New York County District Attorney office. Former prize fighter Danny Gentile turned himself in at the end of March, appearing with his lawyer in Assistant D.A. William J. Keating's office. All three accused men were held in custody without bail. Due to both the extensive press coverage of the event and Dunn's underworld connections, there was concern that the state's star witness, the deceased's widow Maisie Hintz, might be in danger and she was forced to go into hiding until the start of the trial. The trial, before Judge George L. Donnellan, began on December 4 with the selection of the jury, and on December 31, 1947, all three – Dunn, Sheridan and Gentile – were convicted of murder in the first degree and sentenced to death in the electric chair.

== Execution ==
Dunn and Gentile then offered information against waterfront racketeers in exchange for life imprisonment. Since all of his information – incriminating dead people or talking about cases in a way the authorities knew was false – was useless, the deal with Dunn fell through. He and Sheridan were executed at Sing Sing on July 7, 1949. On the day before his scheduled execution, Gentile's death sentence was commuted to life imprisonment by Governor Thomas E. Dewey, supported by a favorable letter from D.A. Frank Hogan, in which he claimed that "Gentile has done everything within his power to assist this office in its investigation of waterfront criminal activity."

== See also ==
- Capital punishment in New York
- List of people executed in New York
- List of people executed in the United States in 1949
- List of people executed by electrocution

== Bibliography ==
- Carter, Richard; Keating, William J. (1956). The Man Who Rocked the Boat (First ed.). New York: Harper & Brothers. ASIN B0000CJGOM.
