= Capital punishment in Alaska =

Capital punishment has never been practiced within Alaska throughout its history as a state, as it was abolished in 1957. Between December 28, 1869, and April 14, 1950, between the Department, District, and Territory of Alaska, twelve felons, all male, were executed by hanging for murder, robbery, and other crimes. Some were European, some were Native American, and two were African. The territorial legislature abolished capital punishment in 1957 during preparations for statehood, making Alaska the first in the West Coast of the United States to outlaw executions, along with Hawaii, which did the same.

== 19th century ==
There is no recorded history of any executions occurring in Alaska prior to its purchase by the United States government and its designation as the Department of Alaska. There are only four recorded executions in Alaska during the 19th century.

The first recorded execution to occur in the Alaskan Territory was that of a Stikine Native American, only known by the name Scutd-doo, on December 29, 1869. The Espy Files have his name misspelled as "Scutdor." Scutd-doo was convicted of murdering Leon Smith, a naval commander, on December 25, 1869. Leon Smith's murder was in retaliation for the murder of Scutd-doo's relative, a brother or cousin known as Lowan or Si-Wau, who had been murdered by American soldiers after being involved in an altercation with them in which he bit off the finger of the wife of the quartermaster of Fort Wrangell. The murder of Leon Smith prompted an incident known as the Wrangell Bombardment, wherein the United States Army issued an ultimatum to the Stikine village of Old Wrangell demanding Scutd-doo's surrender. Two days after the United States Army and Stikine villagers exchanged fire, Scutd-doo was handed over to the United States Army, court-martialed, and publicly hanged in front of his fellow villagers on December 29, 1869, only four days after Smith's murder. The hanging occurred during the daytime; Scutd-doo's body was left hanging until nightfall to serve as a warning.

The second execution in the Alaskan Territory was that of John Boyd, a white miner in Wrangell who had murdered another miner, Thomas O'Brien, on December 13, 1878, during a drunken argument over a woman. Wrangell miners held a makeshift court in which Boyd was convicted of O'Brien's murder. Boyd was publicly hanged the next day. Newspapers erroneously called Boyd the first person to be hanged in Alaska. The hanging was purported to have occurred in front of a group of 800 Native Americans.

The last hanging in Alaska during the 19th century was that of Charlie Green (or Charley Green) and Boxer, two Native American men who were accused of clubbing to death a white rum salesman named Richard Rainey. The execution is reported to have occurred on either July 30, 1883, or August 14, 1883. A few reports on this execution refer to it as a lynching rather than a legal execution.

== 20th century ==
Eight of Alaska's twelve recorded executions took place in the 20th century.

The first was the hanging of Fred Hardy, who was convicted of murdering Florence and Con Sullivan, two brothers who were natives of Montana, and F.J. Rooney. The murders took place on Unimak Island on June 7, 1901. The brothers had migrated north a month prior to their murders, while Rooney was simply accompanying them on a prospecting expedition when they were waylaid by Hardy, who shot and murdered all three before robbing them. Hardy received his death sentence on September 7, 1901, and the hanging took place at 9:40 AM on the morning of September 19, 1902. Frank H. Richards, the U.S. Marshal to the Second Judicial District of Alaska, read the death warrant to Hardy. As opposed to the hangings of Scutd-doo and Boyd, which had occurred in public, the hanging of Hardy occurred in what newspapers called "an addition built to the ice-house on the lot opposite the jail". Like Boyd, newspapers erroneously called Hardy the first person to be legally hanged in the territory. Hardy was, however, the first person to be hanged in what was known as the District of Alaska, which was Alaska's designation from 1884 to 1912. All four of the previous recorded executions in the territory occurred when it was known as the Department of Alaska. Hardy was also the first person hanged in Alaska after a lengthy appeals process, as Scutd-doo, John Boyd, Charlie Green, and Boxer were all hanged within mere days of their trials.

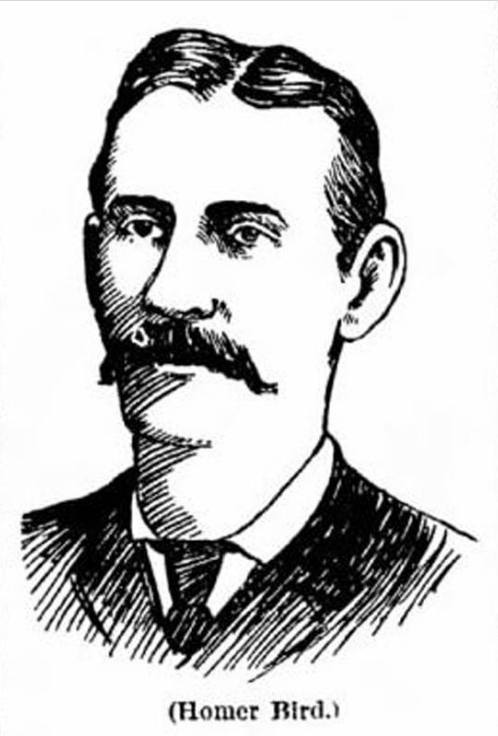
Sketch of Homer Bird - recreated from a photograph and published in a New Orleans newspaper, The Times-Picayune, on July 16, 1899.

The second 20th-century execution in Alaska was that of Homer Bird, the only person to be legally executed in Sitka. Bird, a native of New Orleans, Louisiana, was convicted of the murders of J.H. Hurlin and Robert L. Patterson. Bird had traveled Northwest to Alaska due to the Klondike Gold Rush and joined with a group consisting of Hurlin, Patterson, Charles Sheffler, and Bird's lover, Norma Strong; he shot Hurlin and Patterson in a fit of jealousy on September 27, 1898. While Hurlin died on the day of the shooting, Patterson temporarily survived and was transported to Anvik, Alaska, where he lingered before succumbing to his injuries more than six months later, on April 8, 1899. Bird's death sentence was passed on February 9, 1900, and after a protracted legal battle, he was hanged more than three years later on March 6, 1903.

There were no recorded executions in Alaska during the 1910s. Eighteen years after the execution of Homer Bird, Mailo Segura was hanged in Fairbanks on April 15, 1921, for murdering his employer, J.E. Reilly. Segura, a native of Montenegro, had a trial marked by racial prejudice based on his appearance and the social prominence of his victim, with trial documents referring to Segura as a "black fellow" and a "bohunk" (an ethnic slur) in spite of his European heritage. Segura's attorney petitioned for a change of venue based on the racial prejudice surrounding Segura's trial, but the motion was denied.

The next two executions were notoriously botched. On October 7, 1921, a Native American known only as "Hamilton" or "John Doe Hamilton" was executed by hanging in Fairbanks. Hamilton, who spoke no English, was convicted of murdering his cousin due to his cousin domestically abusing his wife. Hamilton expressed shame for his crime and requested the death penalty for himself; Hamilton's attorney also did not try to argue against the verdict or the sentence, telling the court during Hamilton's sentencing, "The man is guilty, and there is absolutely no reason which his counsel knows why sentence should not be pronounced." During Hamilton's hanging, when the trap door fell, the drop was too long, leading to Hamilton being decapitated.

The second botched hanging was that of Constantine Beaver, another Native American man who spoke no English and was convicted of murdering Egnatty Necketta, a friend, during a drunken brawl on November 15, 1928. Beaver received a court-appointed attorney who only had one week to prepare for the trial, and when the attorney petitioned for an extension so he could prepare a better case, his petition was denied. While the jury found Beaver guilty of murder, they chose to return a 'silent' ballot on the penalty portion, leading to the judge instating a death sentence against Beaver. One week after the death sentence, three jurors filed sworn statements protesting the death penalty as a sentence for Beaver and stating that they did not know their 'silent' ballot could result in a death sentence and would have requested a sentence of life imprisonment had they known, but to no avail. As Alaska criminal cases at the time were considered the responsibility of the United States Federal Government, Beaver petitioned President Herbert Hoover for clemency and a commutation to a life sentence, but Hoover denied clemency. The hanging took place on September 7, 1929, in a building "adjoining the federal courthouse". Whereas the drop Hamilton received was too long, the drop Beaver received was insufficient to break his neck, leading to Beaver strangling to death.

Nelson Charles, a Native American man from Ketchikan, Alaska, was hanged on November 10, 1939, for sexually assaulting and stabbing to death Cecelia Johnson, his 58-year-old mother-in-law. Charles was the only person executed in recorded Alaskan history for murdering a woman. Charles was convicted by an all-white jury at a time when Ketchikan was racially segregated. His attorney, who only had a few days to prepare for the case before it went to trial, petitioned for an extension and was rejected. Charles was allegedly heavily intoxicated during the time that he committed the crime, which was information that could have saved his life, as at the time, a person could not be found guilty of first-degree murder if they were sufficiently impaired by alcohol during the crime's commission.

The final two executions in Alaska occurred in connection with the same crime. Austin Nelson and Eugene LaMoore, who were both African American men, were both convicted of murdering Jim Ellen, a shopkeeper in Juneau. Originally, only Nelson was suspected of being involved in Ellen's murder in December 1946. LaMoore testified as an alibi witness for Nelson, stating that he had spent the evening of the murder elsewhere with Nelson, but due to LaMoore lying elsewhere in his testimony about a felony robbery conviction twenty years prior, the jury discounted LaMoore's testimony, convicted Nelson of murder, and recommended the death penalty. LaMoore was later arrested for perjury. Nelson visited LaMoore while LaMoore waited in jail for his perjury trial and pleaded with LaMoore to save his life, leading to LaMoore writing a document in which he implicated himself in the robbery and murder of Jim Ellen. LaMoore retracted the confession and stated that he only made it in a futile attempt to save Nelson's life, but LaMoore was convicted of murder and sentenced to death anyway. Nelson won a brief reprieve in case his testimony was needed in LaMoore's trial, but he was never called to testify; Nelson was executed on March 1, 1948, one month after LaMoore's trial ended. Like the hangings of Hamilton and Beaver, LaMoore's hanging, which took place on April 14, 1950, was allegedly botched as well. The site where LaMoore was hanged is now the lobby of a State Office Building.

No executions occurred in Alaska after statehood.

== Abolition ==
In 1957, the Alaska Territorial Legislature passed a measure stating simply: "The death penalty is and shall hereafter be abolished as punishment in Alaska for the commission of any crime." The abolition followed prolonged debates during discussions pertaining to Alaskan statehood, during which Warren A. Taylor gave an "impassioned speech" pleading for the death penalty to be abolished in the state.

The junior sponsor of the abolition bill, Vic Fisher, stated that one factor that motivated Alaskan politicians to abolish the death penalty was concern surrounding the racial disparity in its application. Researcher Averil Lerman, who analyzed Alaska's death penalty during legislative attempts to revive capital punishment in the 1990s, noted that the death penalty in Alaska was very rarely employed, and when it was, it was almost exclusively and disproportionately used against Native Americans and Black people; it was also exclusively utilized against people of any race who could not afford better legal help. In one case, a man named Vuco Perovich had been sentenced to death in Fairbanks in 1904 for murdering a fisherman with an axe and committing arson to conceal the crime. Although Perovich received the death penalty, his friends, who were wealthy, provided financial backing for his appeals, leading to President William Taft commuting the death sentence. Years later, President Calvin Coolidge granted Perovich a pardon, leading to Perovich's release from prison. He moved to New York and became a successful businessman. Another man, William Dempsey, murdered a woman in 1919 and later murdered a U.S. marshal who attempted to arrest him for the murder of the woman. Dempsey received the death penalty for both murders, but his family could afford an attorney who successfully petitioned President Woodrow Wilson for clemency. Dempsey's sentence was changed to life imprisonment.

Lerman noted that out of 183 murderers convicted in Alaska between 1935 and 1958, 138 of them were white, two were black, 10 were indigenous Alaskans, 22 were of other Native American heritage, 7 were Filipino, and 1 was uncategorized. Nevertheless, the only two black people, Austin Nelson and Eugene LaMoore, were executed, while one Native American, Nelson Charles, was executed as well, and no one of any other race was subjected to the death penalty.

Since the death penalty's abolition in 1957, there have been several measures to revive the death penalty, but none have been successful.

== List of executions in Alaska, 1869–1950 ==
All of the people executed in Alaska between 1869 and 1950 were men. They were all executed by hanging.

Name	Race	Age	County/Settlement	Date of Execution	Crime
Scutd-doo (or Scutdor)	Native American (Stikine)	?	Wrangell	1869-12-29	Murder of Leon Smith
John Boyd	White	?	Wrangell	1878-12-14	Murder of Thomas O'Brien
Charlie Green	Native American	?	Juneau	1883-07-30	Murder of Richard Rainey
Boxer	Native American	?	Juneau	1883-07-30	Murder of Richard Rainey
Fred Hardy	White	26	Nome	1902-09-19	Murder and robbery of F.J. Rooney, Florence Sullivan, and Con Sullivan
Homer Bird	White	45	Sitka	1903-03-06	Murder of J.H. Hurlin and Robert L. Patterson
Mailo Segura	White (Montenegrin)	36	Fairbanks	1921-04-15	Murder of J.E. Reilly
(John Doe) Hamilton	Native American	?	Fairbanks	1921-10-07	Murder of his cousin
Constantine Beaver	Native American	32	Fairbanks	1929-09-07	Murder of Egnatty Necketta
Nelson Charles	Native American	38	Juneau	1939-11-10	Murder and sexual assault of Cecelia Johnson
Austin Nelson	Black	29	Juneau	1948-03-01	Murder of Jim Ellen
Eugene LaMoore	Black	46	Juneau	1950-04-14	Murder of Jim Ellen

== Additional reading ==
- Young, Patricia (2009), preparer. Legislative research report: Capital punishment in the U.S. and in Alaska. Juneau: Alaska Legislature Legislative Research Services.
