= List of people executed in the United States in 1951 =

One hundred and one people, one hundred male and one female, were executed in the United States in 1951, eighty by electrocution, fourteen by gas chamber, five by hanging, and two by firing squad. This is the most recent year with at least one hundred executions carried out in America — the closest total during the post-Gregg era was in 1999, when nearly one hundred people were executed.

== List of people executed in the United States in 1951 ==
No.	Date of execution	Name	Age of person			Gender	Ethnicity	State	Method	Ref.
No.	Date of execution	Name	At execution	At offense	Age difference	Gender	Ethnicity	State	Method	Ref.
1	January 4, 1951	Max Eugene Klettke	25	23	2	Male	White	Oklahoma	Electrocution	
2	January 5, 1951	Robert Othe Layton	43	41	2	Male	White	Louisiana	Electrocution	
3	January 5, 1951	Claud McGee	38	35	3	Male	White	Missouri	Gas chamber	
4	January 8, 1951	Walter McDonald	21	20	1	Male	Black	Florida	Electrocution	
5	January 8, 1951	L.D. Robinson	46	45	1	Male	Black	Florida	Electrocution	
6	January 8, 1951	George Wolfork Jr.	28	27	1	Male	Black	Florida	Electrocution	
7	January 8, 1951	Robert Clement Shupp	49	48	1	Male	White	Pennsylvania	Electrocution	
8	January 8, 1951	Alexander Agoston Jr.	43	40	3	Male	White	Pennsylvania	Electrocution	
9	January 11, 1951	Harley LaMarr	20	19	1	Male	Native American	New York	Electrocution	
10	January 12, 1951	J.D. Dowdy	25	23	2	Male	White	Louisiana	Electrocution	
11	January 12, 1951	A.C. Stone Jr.	25	Unknown	Unknown	Male	Black	Mississippi	Electrocution	
12	January 13, 1951	Ben Pickett Jr.	34	32	2	Male	Black	Texas	Electrocution	
13	January 16, 1951	Robert Austin Watts	28	24	4	Male	Black	Indiana	Electrocution	
14	January 26, 1951	Dale Smith Simpson	29	27	2	Male	White	Louisiana	Electrocution	
15	January 26, 1951	Dwight David Tudor	28	26	2	Male	White	Ohio	Electrocution	
16	January 29, 1951	Theodore William Gregory	46	43	3	Male	White	Nevada	Gas chamber	
17	February 1, 1951	Thomas Jefferson Price	30	25	5	Male	White	Texas	Electrocution	
18	February 2, 1951	Murdock Hinton	47	44	3	Male	White	Mississippi	Electrocution	
19	February 2, 1951	George Thomas Hailey	29	28	1	Male	White	Virginia	Electrocution	
20	February 2, 1951	Joe Henry Hampton	21	19	2	Male	Black	Virginia	Electrocution	
21	February 2, 1951	Howard Lee Hairston	20	18	2	Male	Black	Virginia	Electrocution	
22	February 2, 1951	Booker T. Millner	22	19	2	Male	Black	Virginia	Electrocution	
23	February 2, 1951	Frank Hairston Jr.	20	18	2	Male	Black	Virginia	Electrocution	
24	February 5, 1951	John Claborn Taylor	23	21	2	Male	Black	Virginia	Electrocution	
25	February 5, 1951	James Luther Hairston	22	20	2	Male	Black	Virginia	Electrocution	
26	February 5, 1951	Francis DeSales Grayson	38	36	2	Male	Black	Virginia	Electrocution	
27	February 9, 1951	George Ernest Doty	28	28	0	Male	White	Ohio	Electrocution	
28	February 15, 1951	Willie Winston Bunch	21	20	1	Male	Black	New York	Electrocution	
29	February 21, 1951	Charles R. Gifford	70	69	1	Male	White	Florida	Electrocution	
30	February 23, 1951	Matthew Ezell	38	36	2	Male	Black	Arkansas	Electrocution	
31	February 23, 1951	George Ferguson	35	34	1	Male	Black	Arkansas	Electrocution	
32	March 1, 1951	Gilberto C. Walker	27	25	2	Male	Black	New York	Electrocution	
33	March 2, 1951	Monroe Arthur Jackson	34	33	1	Male	White	California	Gas chamber	
34	March 2, 1951	Willie B. Harris	47	45	2	Male	Black	Georgia	Electrocution	
35	March 8, 1951	John J. King	22	21	1	Male	White	New York	Electrocution	
36	March 8, 1951	Richard Power	22	21	1	Male	White	New York	Electrocution	
37	March 8, 1951	Raymond Martinez Fernandez	36	34	2	Male	Hispanic	New York	Electrocution	
38	March 8, 1951	Martha Jule Beck	30	28	2	Female	White	New York	Electrocution	
39	March 14, 1951	Jimmie Bryant Patterson	44	43	1	Male	White	Texas	Electrocution	
40	March 16, 1951	Harold Sexton	23	22	1	Male	White	California	Gas chamber	
41	March 21, 1951	Allen Conway Williams	41	39	2	Male	White	Texas	Electrocution	
42	March 22, 1951	Houston Roberts	45	44	1	Male	White	Mississippi	Electrocution	
43	March 23, 1951	James Richard Hall	27	26	1	Male	White	North Carolina	Gas chamber	
44	March 23, 1951	Curtis Shedd	28	27	1	Male	White	North Carolina	Gas chamber	
45	March 26, 1951	Harry Atlee Burdette Sr.	27	25	2	Male	White	West Virginia	Electrocution	
46	March 26, 1951	Fred Clifford Painter	33	31	2	Male	White	West Virginia	Electrocution	
47	March 27, 1951	Howard Auld	30	25	5	Male	White	New Jersey	Electrocution	
48	April 6, 1951	Preston F. McBride	25	24	1	Male	White	Kansas	Hanging	
49	April 10, 1951	James William Hewlett Jr.	21	21	0	Male	White	West Virginia	Electrocution	
50	April 12, 1951	John Saiu	38	36	2	Male	White	New York	Electrocution	
51	April 13, 1951	Troy Dale Powell	21	20	1	Male	White	Idaho	Hanging	
52	April 13, 1951	Ernest Lee Walrath Jr.	20	19	1	Male	White	Idaho	Hanging	
53	April 23, 1951	Edward Lester Gibbs	26	25	1	Male	White	Pennsylvania	Electrocution	
54	April 27, 1951	John Henry Rogers	26	25	1	Male	Black	North Carolina	Gas chamber	
55	April 27, 1951	Morzell Eakins	33	32	1	Male	Black	Ohio	Electrocution	
56	May 8, 1951	Willie McGee	35	29	6	Male	Black	Mississippi	Electrocution	
57	May 11, 1951	William Alleman	22	21	1	Male	White	Louisiana	Electrocution	
58	May 25, 1951	Jimmie C. Williams	28	27	1	Male	Black	Georgia	Electrocution	
59	June 4, 1951	Jessie Hilton	34	33	1	Male	Black	Florida	Electrocution	
60	June 4, 1951	John Washington Jr.	25	24	1	Male	Black	Florida	Electrocution	
61	June 8, 1951	Albert Shelkels	20	18	2	Male	Black	Kentucky	Electrocution	
62	June 8, 1951	Edward Honeycutt	24	21	3	Male	Black	Louisiana	Electrocution	
63	June 18, 1951	Wayne Dale Odell	23	22	1	Male	White	Washington	Hanging	
64	June 27, 1951	Morris Bessard	22	20	2	Male	Black	Texas	Electrocution	
65	July 3, 1951	Sam Williams	53	52	1	Male	Black	Texas	Electrocution	
66	July 13, 1951	Ulysses Jones	32	32	0	Male	Black	Virginia	Electrocution	
67	July 16, 1951	Y.D. Robinson	33	32	1	Male	Black	Texas	Electrocution	
68	July 18, 1951	Harold Thomas Lantz	28	27	1	Male	White	Arizona	Gas chamber	
69	July 20, 1951	Milton Harold Wilson	40	35	5	Male	Black	Louisiana	Electrocution	
70	July 24, 1951	Gregorio P. Arellano	28	26	2	Male	Hispanic	Nevada	Gas chamber	
71	July 27, 1951	Aubrey Smith	30	29	1	Male	Black	Arkansas	Electrocution	
72	July 27, 1951	George Wilbur Solesbee	29	25	4	Male	White	Georgia	Electrocution	
73	July 27, 1951	Jearell Hathcox	38	37	1	Male	White	Oklahoma	Electrocution	
74	August 6, 1951	James E. Felton	25	23	2	Male	Black	Florida	Electrocution	
75	August 6, 1951	Willie London	42	40	2	Male	Black	Florida	Electrocution	
76	August 17, 1951	John Calvin Odle	59	58	1	Male	White	California	Gas chamber	
77	September 5, 1951	Fred Felix Adair Jr.	27	24	3	Male	White	Texas	Electrocution	
78	September 5, 1951	Allen Matthews	24	Unknown	3	Male	Black	Texas	Electrocution	
79	September 5, 1951	L.C. Sims	26	24	2	Male	Black	Texas	Electrocution	
80	September 7, 1951	Excel Beauchamp	23	23	0	Male	Black	Louisiana	Electrocution	
81	September 10, 1951	Eliseo J. Mares Jr.	23	18	5	Male	Hispanic	Utah	Firing squad	
82	September 14, 1951	Claude Leon Osborn	36	35	1	Male	Black	California	Gas chamber	
83	September 21, 1951	Melburn Joseph Mott	36	33	3	Male	White	Oklahoma	Electrocution	
84	September 25, 1951	Steve M. Mitchell	49	46	3	Male	White	Texas	Electrocution	
85	September 29, 1951	Ray Dempsey Gardner	29	27	2	Male	White	Utah	Firing squad	
86	October 5, 1951	Eldred Byrd McLendon Jr.	38	35	3	Male	White	Georgia	Electrocution	
87	October 9, 1951	Albert Rodgers Edwards	39	37	2	Male	White	Texas	Electrocution	
88	October 26, 1951	John J. Berger Jr.	34	31	3	Male	White	Colorado	Gas chamber	
89	November 2, 1951	Ray Cullen	65	62	3	Male	White	California	Gas chamber	
90	November 2, 1951	Willie Ford Ballard	22	22	0	Male	Black	Georgia	Electrocution	
91	November 15, 1951	Max K. Amerman	28	27	1	Male	White	Ohio	Electrocution	
92	November 16, 1951	Carroll Gantt	18	18	0	Male	Black	South Carolina	Electrocution	
93	November 23, 1951	Arthur Nox Grays	23	23	0	Male	Black	Arkansas	Electrocution	
94	November 23, 1951	Peter Dorsey	27	26	1	Male	Black	Arkansas	Electrocution	
95	November 30, 1951	Felix Chavez Jr.	27	25	2	Male	Hispanic	California	Gas chamber	
96	December 8, 1951	Abbie Mouton	32	30	2	Male	Black	Texas	Electrocution	
97	December 10, 1951	Grant Ellis Rio	29	27	2	Male	White	Washington	Hanging	
98	December 12, 1951	Floyd Joyner Jr.	39	38	1	Male	Black	Virginia	Electrocution	
99	December 14, 1951	Jim Parks	45	45	0	Male	Black	Georgia	Electrocution	
100	December 17, 1951	Vester William McBurnett	43	40	3	Male	White	Georgia	Electrocution	
101	December 20, 1951	Jefro Price	28	27	1	Male	Black	Mississippi	Electrocution	

== Demographics ==
Gender
Male	100	99%
Female	1	1%
Ethnicity
White	50	50%
Black	46	46%
Hispanic	4	4%
Native American	1	1%
State
Texas	13	13%
Virginia	10	10%
Florida	8	8%
New York	8	8%
Georgia	7	7%
Louisiana	7	7%
California	6	6%
Arkansas	5	5%
Mississippi	5	5%
Ohio	4	4%
North Carolina	3	3%
Oklahoma	3	3%
Pennsylvania	3	3%
West Virginia	3	3%
Idaho	2	2%
Nevada	2	2%
Utah	2	2%
Washington	2	2%
Arizona	1	1%
Colorado	1	1%
Indiana	1	1%
Kansas	1	1%
Kentucky	1	1%
Missouri	1	1%
New Jersey	1	1%
South Carolina	1	1%
Method
Electrocution	80	79%
Gas chamber	14	14%
Hanging	5	5%
Firing squad	2	2%
Month
January	16	16%
February	15	15%
March	16	16%
April	8	8%
May	3	3%
June	6	6%
July	9	9%
August	3	3%
September	9	9%
October	3	3%
November	7	7%
December	6	6%
Age
10–19	1	1%
20–29	55	54%
30–39	26	26%
40–49	15	15%
50–59	2	2%
60–69	1	1%
70–79	1	1%
Total	101	100%

== Executions in recent years ==
Number of executions
1952	81
1951	101
1950	83
Total	265

Preceded by 1950	List of people executed in the United States in 1951	Succeeded by 1952
