= List of people executed in the United States in 1950 =

Eighty-three people, all male, were executed in the United States in 1950, sixty-six by electrocution, fifteen by gas chamber, and two by hanging. The Territory of Alaska carried out its last execution prior to the abolition of capital punishment in 1957.

== List of people executed in the United States in 1950 ==
No.	Date of execution	Name	Age of person			Gender	Ethnicity	State	Method	Ref.
No.	Date of execution	Name	At execution	At offense	Age difference	Gender	Ethnicity	State	Method	Ref.
1	January 5, 1950	Frank Bruno	33	29	4	Male	White	New York	Electrocution	
2	January 6, 1950	Lee Heller	49	48	1	Male	Black	North Carolina	Gas chamber	
3	January 9, 1950	Edward E. DiPofi Jr.	25	23	2	Male	White	Pennsylvania	Electrocution	
4	January 9, 1950	Ray Herman Simmons	26	23	3	Male	White	Pennsylvania	Electrocution	
5	January 12, 1950	Eddie Patton	38	34	4	Male	Black	Mississippi	Electrocution	
6	January 12, 1950	George Peter Reeh	32	31	1	Male	White	New York	Electrocution	
7	January 24, 1950	Clyde Steele	20	18	2	Male	Black	Tennessee	Electrocution	
8	January 26, 1950	Arthur Moore	18	16	2	Male	Black	Mississippi	Electrocution	
9	January 27, 1950	Eddie Houser Jr.	22	Unknown	Unknown	Male	Black	Georgia	Electrocution	
10	January 29, 1950	Samuel B. Gibson	24	22	2	Male	Black	Texas	Electrocution	
11	February 5, 1950	William Wilson Jr.	31	29	2	Male	Black	Texas	Electrocution	
12	February 9, 1950	James Wood Morrow Jr.	29	27	2	Male	White	Texas	Electrocution	
13	February 24, 1950	Victoriano Corrales	48	47	1	Male	Hispanic	California	Gas chamber	
14	February 24, 1950	Raymond Ellison	38	36	2	Male	White	Kentucky	Electrocution	
15	February 24, 1950	Harry Z. Dodds Jr.	21	20	1	Male	White	Ohio	Electrocution	
16	February 27, 1950	John William Givens	52	49	3	Male	White	Pennsylvania	Electrocution	
17	February 27, 1950	George N. Minoff	52	50	2	Male	White	Pennsylvania	Electrocution	
18	March 10, 1950	Thomas Edwin Black	28	27	1	Male	White	Arkansas	Electrocution	
19	March 17, 1950	Hollis Edward Needham	27	26	1	Male	White	Arkansas	Electrocution	
20	March 31, 1950	Armand Halcyon Letourneau	40	38	2	Male	White	California	Gas chamber	
21	April 4, 1950	Buford Tansimore	53	51	2	Male	Black	New Jersey	Electrocution	
22	April 5, 1950	James Willis Blackmon Jr.	24	23	1	Male	Black	Texas	Electrocution	
23	April 5, 1950	William Smith Jr.	22	20	2	Male	Black	Texas	Electrocution	
24	April 14, 1950	Eugene LaMoore	46	42	4	Male	Black	Federal government	Hanging	
25	April 21, 1950	Jesse Wyatt	39	38	1	Male	Black	Georgia	Electrocution	
26	April 21, 1950	Fred Varela	26	24	2	Male	Hispanic	Illinois	Electrocution	
27	April 21, 1950	Alphonso Najera	27	25	2	Male	Hispanic	Illinois	Electrocution	
28	April 24, 1950	Robert Louis Smith	41	40	1	Male	White	Arkansas	Electrocution	
29	April 28, 1950	John Patrick Carrigan	29	28	1	Male	White	Georgia	Electrocution	
30	May 3, 1950	Lee Everett Bunn	27	26	1	Male	Black	Texas	Electrocution	
31	May 6, 1950	George Miller	60	57	3	Male	Black	Kansas	Hanging	
32	May 10, 1950	Theodore Roosevelt McClure Jr.	25	21	4	Male	Black	Ohio	Electrocution	
33	May 17, 1950	Nathaniel Edwards	27	26	1	Male	Black	Texas	Electrocution	
34	May 19, 1950	Charles Henry Tiedt	55	51	4	Male	White	Missouri	Gas chamber	
35	May 19, 1950	John Robert Bridges	22	21	1	Male	White	North Carolina	Gas chamber	
36	May 25, 1950	John West Pulliam	19	18	1	Male	Black	Mississippi	Electrocution	
37	May 25, 1950	Julio Ramirez Perez	38	36	2	Male	Hispanic	New York	Electrocution	
38	May 26, 1950	Charley Smith	25	23	2	Male	Black	Alabama	Electrocution	
39	May 26, 1950	Robert Frank Bryan	19	Unknown	Unknown	Male	Black	Georgia	Electrocution	
40	June 2, 1950	Edward Albert Huizenga	58	57	1	Male	White	California	Gas chamber	
41	June 2, 1950	Charles Walter Butler	40	36	4	Male	Black	South Carolina	Electrocution	
42	June 5, 1950	Henry Van Tillman	50	49	1	Male	White	Florida	Electrocution	
43	June 9, 1950	William R. Ray	35	33	2	Male	White	Texas	Electrocution	
44	June 14, 1950	Porter Henderson	47	Unknown	Unknown	Male	Black	Texas	Electrocution	
45	June 16, 1950	Columbus Webb	43	41	2	Male	White	Kentucky	Electrocution	
46	June 21, 1950	Felix Ambrose Lewis	47	46	1	Male	White	Texas	Electrocution	
47	June 22, 1950	Dan White	49	47	2	Male	White	Texas	Electrocution	
48	June 30, 1950	Ernest T. Preylow	31	31	0	Male	Black	South Carolina	Electrocution	
49	June 30, 1950	Eugene McFarland	26	25	1	Male	Black	Texas	Electrocution	
50	July 14, 1950	Lovell Shaffer	26	25	1	Male	Black	Mississippi	Electrocution	
51	July 14, 1950	Otis Wilkerson	26	25	1	Male	Black	Mississippi	Electrocution	
52	July 21, 1950	Joe Keith	29	27	2	Male	Black	Alabama	Electrocution	
53	July 21, 1950	Homer Garland Odom	24	22	2	Male	White	Alabama	Electrocution	
54	July 21, 1950	Claude B. Sims	20	19	1	Male	Black	Alabama	Electrocution	
55	July 21, 1950	Claude Everett Shackelford	34	33	1	Male	White	North Carolina	Gas chamber	
56	July 21, 1950	Delbert Lovell Spencer	51	47	4	Male	White	Ohio	Electrocution	
57	July 29, 1950	Angel B. Serna	27	24	3	Male	Hispanic	Arizona	Gas chamber	
58	August 4, 1950	Henry Hooper	45	44	1	Male	Black	California	Gas chamber	
59	August 4, 1950	Larry Elmore	43	42	1	Male	Black	South Carolina	Electrocution	
60	August 18, 1950	Charles Cade	20	19	1	Male	Black	Georgia	Electrocution	
61	August 18, 1950	Lincoln Mays	24	23	1	Male	Black	Georgia	Electrocution	
62	August 18, 1950	Curtis Wynn Jr.	20	19	1	Male	Black	Georgia	Electrocution	
63	August 24, 1950	James Williams	32	30	2	Male	Black	Nevada	Gas chamber	
64	September 12, 1950	Cecil H. Yankey	42	39	3	Male	White	Ohio	Electrocution	
65	September 25, 1950	Walter Joseph Maloney Jr.	42	40	2	Male	White	Pennsylvania	Electrocution	
66	September 25, 1950	Alexander Niemi	31	29	2	Male	White	Pennsylvania	Electrocution	
67	September 29, 1950	George McKay	36	30	6	Male	Black	Georgia	Electrocution	
68	October 6, 1950	Herman Avery	50	49	1	Male	Black	California	Gas chamber	
69	October 6, 1950	Henry Brun Guldbrandsen	36	34	2	Male	White	California	Gas chamber	
70	October 28, 1950	Jimmie Lee Gardner	27	26	1	Male	Black	Georgia	Electrocution	
71	November 3, 1950	Jimmie Richardson	47	47	0	Male	Black	Georgia	Electrocution	
72	November 3, 1950	John Walton Wallace	54	51	3	Male	White	Georgia	Electrocution	
73	November 10, 1950	Covey Conner Lamm	48	47	1	Male	White	North Carolina	Gas chamber	
74	November 17, 1950	Willard Truelove	31	30	1	Male	Black	Illinois	Electrocution	
75	November 17, 1950	Alfred Rayfield	35	35	0	Male	Black	Virginia	Electrocution	
76	November 21, 1950	George A. Kersey Sr.	28	27	1	Male	White	Georgia	Electrocution	
77	November 21, 1950	Thomas Lynch	31	31	0	Male	White	Georgia	Electrocution	
78	November 24, 1950	Ernest Lyles	33	Unknown	Unknown	Male	White	North Carolina	Gas chamber	
79	December 1, 1950	Paul Montez Gutierrez	26	25	1	Male	Hispanic	California	Gas chamber	
80	December 1, 1950	Edward Sanford	Unknown	Unknown	Unknown	Male	Black	Louisiana	Electrocution	
81	December 8, 1950	Ben Franklin Fuller	43	42	1	Male	Black	Virginia	Electrocution	
82	December 29, 1950	Edward Exnoal Johnson Jr.	31	30	1	Male	Black	Texas	Electrocution	
83	December 30, 1950	Franklin Sherman Click	31	25	6	Male	White	Indiana	Electrocution	

== Demographics ==
Gender
Male	83	100%
Female	0	0%
Ethnicity
Black	42	51%
White	35	42%
Hispanic	6	7%
State
Georgia	13	16%
Texas	13	16%
California	7	8%
Pennsylvania	6	7%
Mississippi	5	6%
North Carolina	5	6%
Alabama	4	5%
Ohio	4	5%
Arkansas	3	4%
Illinois	3	4%
New York	3	4%
South Carolina	3	4%
Kentucky	2	2%
Virginia	2	2%
Arizona	1	1%
Federal government	1	1%
Florida	1	1%
Indiana	1	1%
Kansas	1	1%
Louisiana	1	1%
Missouri	1	1%
Nevada	1	1%
New Jersey	1	1%
Tennessee	1	1%
Method
Electrocution	66	80%
Gas chamber	15	18%
Hanging	2	2%
Month
January	10	12%
February	7	8%
March	3	4%
April	9	11%
May	10	12%
June	10	12%
July	8	10%
August	6	7%
September	4	5%
October	3	4%
November	8	10%
December	5	6%
Age
Unknown	1	1%
10–19	3	4%
20–29	32	39%
30–39	20	24%
40–49	17	20%
50–59	9	11%
60–69	1	1%
Total	83	100%

== Executions in recent years ==
Number of executions
1951	101
1950	83
1949	120
Total	304

Preceded by 1949	List of people executed in the United States in 1950	Succeeded by 1951
