= List of people executed in the United States in 1949 =

One hundred and twenty people, all male, were executed in the United States in 1949, eighty-four by electrocution, twenty-eight by gas chamber, and eight by hanging.

== List of people executed in the United States in 1949 ==
No.	Date of execution	Name	Age of person			Gender	Ethnicity	State	Method	Ref.
No.	Date of execution	Name	At execution	At offense	Age difference	Gender	Ethnicity	State	Method	Ref.
1	January 3, 1949	Robert Murl Daniels	24	24	0	Male	White	Ohio	Electrocution	
2	January 6, 1949	Harris Gray	19	18	1	Male	Black	New York	Electrocution	
3	January 7, 1949	Robert Shorts	21	19	2	Male	Black	California	Gas chamber	
4	January 7, 1949	Robert S. Battalino	37	36	1	Male	White	Colorado	Gas chamber	
5	January 13, 1949	Louis Smiley	20	19	1	Male	Black	New York	Electrocution	
6	January 14, 1949	Shirley M. Harris	24	23	1	Male	Black	District of Columbia	Electrocution	
7	January 20, 1949	William Grant	25	23	2	Male	Black	New York	Electrocution	
8	January 20, 1949	George Monge	25	23	2	Male	Black	New York	Electrocution	
9	January 20, 1949	Eugene Pannell	27	25	2	Male	Black	New York	Electrocution	
10	January 24, 1949	Felix Combs	24	24	0	Male	Black	Florida	Electrocution	
11	January 28, 1949	Marvin James Tuthill	45	43	2	Male	White	California	Gas chamber	
12	January 28, 1949	Charlie Pool	44	40	4	Male	Black	Kentucky	Electrocution	
13	January 28, 1949	James Rufus Creech Jr.	37	36	1	Male	White	North Carolina	Gas chamber	
14	February 1, 1949	Wilson Moore	29	27	2	Male	Black	Texas	Electrocution	
15	February 2, 1949	Harold Alfred Beach Jr.	23	22	1	Male	White	Ohio	Electrocution	
16	February 4, 1949	John Thomas	35	34	1	Male	Black	Ohio	Electrocution	
17	February 4, 1949	Willie Lincoln	25	24	1	Male	Black	South Carolina	Electrocution	
18	February 7, 1949	Aaron Quince	20	18	2	Male	Black	Florida	Electrocution	
19	February 13, 1949	Thurman Williams	23	22	1	Male	Black	Texas	Electrocution	
20	February 17, 1949	Barney Thompson	32	31	1	Male	Black	Tennessee	Electrocution	
21	February 18, 1949	Maxwell Bowie	23	21	2	Male	Black	California	Gas chamber	
22	February 18, 1949	Henry Williams	25	23	2	Male	Black	California	Gas chamber	
23	February 21, 1949	Thomas Larkin	27	Unknown	Unknown	Male	Black	Texas	Electrocution	
24	February 23, 1949	Frank Badgley	51	48	3	Male	White	Indiana	Electrocution	
25	February 23, 1949	Robert Oscar Brown	37	35	2	Male	White	Indiana	Electrocution	
26	February 25, 1949	John Henry Hall	35	33	2	Male	Black	District of Columbia	Electrocution	
27	February 25, 1949	Bud Peterson	53	51	2	Male	Black	West Virginia	Hanging	
28	February 28, 1949	Howard Elwood Payton	30	29	1	Male	Black	Ohio	Electrocution	
29	March 3, 1949	Santo Bretagna	27	28	1	Male	White	New York	Electrocution	
30	March 3, 1949	William Rosenberg	42	41	1	Male	White	New York	Electrocution	
31	March 4, 1949	Herbert H. Workman	20	18	2	Male	White	Kentucky	Electrocution	
32	March 4, 1949	Lester Nichols	44	43	1	Male	White	Ohio	Electrocution	
33	March 11, 1949	Phillip Cobb	26	23	3	Male	Black	Alabama	Electrocution	
34	March 11, 1949	L. C. Lloyd	32	Unknown	Unknown	Male	Black	Louisiana	Electrocution	
35	March 15, 1949	Theodore Holmes	20	19	1	Male	Black	District of Columbia	Electrocution	
36	March 18, 1949	Perry Lee Haygood Jr.	26	25	1	Male	Black	Alabama	Electrocution	
37	March 18, 1949	Emmett Garner	37	35	2	Male	White	North Carolina	Gas chamber	
38	March 25, 1949	Buster Snead	42	39	3	Male	Black	Alabama	Electrocution	
39	March 25, 1949	Clarence Joseph Jr.	Unknown	Unknown	Unknown	Male	Black	Louisiana	Electrocution	
40	March 25, 1949	Roy Thomas Cockrell	42	42	0	Male	White	North Carolina	Gas chamber	
41	March 29, 1949	Thomas Kallas	58	56	2	Male	White	Indiana	Electrocution	
42	April 1, 1949	Clayburne Campbell	33	31	2	Male	Black	California	Gas chamber	
43	April 1, 1949	Joel Harrison	23	21	2	Male	Black	California	Gas chamber	
44	April 4, 1949	Arthur Edward Berry	23	22	1	Male	White	Florida	Electrocution	
45	April 8, 1949	Jesse Thurman Carroll	47	46	1	Male	White	Georgia	Electrocution	
46	April 8, 1949	Asbell Glenn Adams	20	19	1	Male	White	Ohio	Electrocution	
47	April 11, 1949	Roger Alton Williams	35	33	2	Male	White	Ohio	Electrocution	
48	April 16, 1949	Buster Northern	20	17	3	Male	White	Texas	Electrocution	
49	April 20, 1949	Junior Moore	24	23	1	Male	Black	Georgia	Electrocution	
50	April 22, 1949	David Leonard Blackwell	19	18	1	Male	White	Nevada	Gas chamber	
51	April 29, 1949	Andrew Martin Berry Jr.	44	43	1	Male	White	Ohio	Electrocution	
52	May 4, 1949	Ralph Reed	27	26	1	Male	White	Ohio	Electrocution	
53	May 20, 1949	Morgan Persons	39	38	1	Male	Black	Georgia	Electrocution	
54	May 20, 1949	Joseph Cook	24	23	1	Male	Black	Louisiana	Electrocution	
55	May 20, 1949	Matthew Cook	23	22	1	Male	Black	Louisiana	Electrocution	
56	May 25, 1949	Frank Millhouse	23	21	2	Male	Black	Ohio	Electrocution	
57	May 27, 1949	John Ross Burson	33	32	1	Male	White	Ohio	Electrocution	
58	June 1, 1949	A. C. Williams	33	32	1	Male	Black	Georgia	Electrocution	
59	June 7, 1949	Laszlo Varga	23	22	1	Male	White	Nevada	Gas chamber	
60	June 10, 1949	Bruce Edward Watson	24	22	2	Male	Black	Tennessee	Electrocution	
61	June 17, 1949	James Edward Lewis	26	Unknown	Unknown	Male	Black	North Carolina	Gas chamber	
62	June 23, 1949	Barney Kenneth Davis Jr.	23	22	1	Male	Black	Ohio	Electrocution	
63	June 24, 1949	Lawrence Benjamin Lightfoot	28	26	2	Male	White	Kentucky	Electrocution	
64	June 27, 1949	Ralph Cordasco	51	50	1	Male	White	New Jersey	Electrocution	
65	June 30, 1949	Harold Dupree	27	25	2	Male	Black	New York	Electrocution	
66	June 30, 1949	Herman Dupree	33	31	2	Male	Black	New York	Electrocution	
67	July 1, 1949	Daniel Jerome Zatzke	23	21	2	Male	White	California	Gas chamber	
68	July 6, 1949	Corliss Robert Bruntlett	52	50	2	Male	White	Iowa	Hanging	
69	July 7, 1949	John Michael Dunn	38	36	2	Male	White	New York	Electrocution	
70	July 7, 1949	Andrew Sheridan	49	46	3	Male	White	New York	Electrocution	
71	July 8, 1949	Howard Andrew Fram	31	29	2	Male	White	Maryland	Hanging	
72	July 11, 1949	Rufus E. Keller	29	28	1	Male	White	Pennsylvania	Electrocution	
73	July 15, 1949	William Paul Sanford	21	20	1	Male	White	California	Gas chamber	
74	July 15, 1949	Jake Bird	47	45	2	Male	Black	Washington	Hanging	
75	July 17, 1949	Mizell Palmer	25	23	2	Male	Black	Arkansas	Electrocution	
76	July 22, 1949	Harvie Lee Rorie	46	45	1	Male	White	Arkansas	Electrocution	
77	July 22, 1949	James Erich Osinski	40	39	1	Male	White	Ohio	Electrocution	
78	July 25, 1949	Mahlon Wisecup	49	48	1	Male	White	Ohio	Electrocution	
79	July 29, 1949	George A. Garner	27	26	1	Male	Black	District of Columbia	Electrocution	
80	July 29, 1949	Lawrence J. Garner	25	24	1	Male	Black	District of Columbia	Electrocution	
81	August 8, 1949	Flem Monroe Griffis	30	28	2	Male	White	Florida	Electrocution	
82	August 10, 1949	Fred W. Jones	40	37	3	Male	White	Texas	Electrocution	
83	August 10, 1949	General Kerzee	53	52	1	Male	Black	Texas	Electrocution	
84	August 12, 1949	Nehemiah Green	26	24	2	Male	Black	Alabama	Electrocution	
85	August 12, 1949	J. C. Winters	20	20	0	Male	Black	Alabama	Electrocution	
86	August 12, 1949	Eugene H. James	31	30	1	Male	Black	Maryland	Hanging	
87	August 12, 1949	John Thomas Knowles	27	26	1	Male	Black	Maryland	Hanging	
88	August 14, 1949	F. M. McClendon	23	21	2	Male	Black	Texas	Electrocution	
89	August 16, 1949	Alfred Collins	37	36	1	Male	Black	New Jersey	Electrocution	
90	August 19, 1949	Andrew Dorsey Jr.	23	21	2	Male	Black	Georgia	Electrocution	
91	September 1, 1949	Floyd Arrington	22	21	1	Male	Black	New York	Electrocution	
92	September 1, 1949	William McKinley Jackson	23	22	1	Male	Black	New York	Electrocution	
93	September 8, 1949	Walter Davis	21	20	1	Male	Black	New York	Electrocution	
94	September 11, 1949	Cleveland Stovall Jr.	22	21	1	Male	Black	Texas	Electrocution	
95	September 12, 1949	John Albert Jones Jr.	17	16	1	Male	Black	Georgia	Electrocution	
96	September 12, 1949	Wilbur Gene Jones	18	17	1	Male	Black	Georgia	Electrocution	
97	September 16, 1949	Herman Frederick Weber Jr.	25	23	2	Male	White	Illinois	Electrocution	
98	September 26, 1949	George A. Neill	24	21	3	Male	White	Pennsylvania	Electrocution	
99	October 18, 1949	Eugene Leo Gambetta	46	44	2	Male	White	Nevada	Gas chamber	
100	October 26, 1949	James W. Buchanan	26	24	2	Male	Black	Ohio	Electrocution	
101	October 28, 1949	Willie James Tolbert Jr.	24	24	0	Male	Black	South Carolina	Electrocution	
102	November 4, 1949	Ernest Afton Scott	49	48	1	Male	White	Missouri	Gas chamber	
103	November 4, 1949	Arthur Bruce Perkins	24	22	2	Male	White	Washington	Hanging	
104	November 15, 1949	Steve Paul Lacy	28	28	0	Male	Black	Tennessee	Electrocution	
105	November 18, 1949	Wayne Leroy Williams	33	31	2	Male	White	Washington	Hanging	
106	November 26, 1949	James Michael Morelli	22	20	2	Male	White	Illinois	Electrocution	
107	December 2, 1949	George U. Bell	37	36	1	Male	Black	Missouri	Gas chamber	
108	December 9, 1949	Walter Pierce	21	Unknown	Unknown	Male	Black	Arkansas	Electrocution	
109	December 9, 1949	Admiral Dewey Adamson	49	44	5	Male	Black	California	Gas chamber	
110	December 9, 1949	Audie Lee Brown	27	26	1	Male	Black	North Carolina	Gas chamber	
111	December 9, 1949	Allen T. Reid	29	28	1	Male	Black	North Carolina	Gas chamber	
112	December 9, 1949	Monroe Medlin	23	23	0	Male	Black	North Carolina	Gas chamber	
113	December 16, 1949	Jesse Albert Murphy	34	33	1	Male	White	California	Gas chamber	
114	December 16, 1949	Albert Eugene Nixon	25	24	1	Male	White	California	Gas chamber	
115	December 16, 1949	Paul Joseph Schneider Jr.	24	22	2	Male	White	Colorado	Gas chamber	
116	December 16, 1949	Lindsey Brown	26	Unknown	Unknown	Male	Black	Georgia	Electrocution	
117	December 16, 1949	Uzelle Jones	35	Unknown	Unknown	Male	Black	North Carolina	Gas chamber	
118	December 23, 1949	Wesley Hildreth	26	25	1	Male	Black	Arkansas	Electrocution	
119	December 30, 1949	Hector Chavis	29	29	0	Male	Native American	North Carolina	Gas chamber	
120	December 30, 1949	Leander Jacobs	29	29	0	Male	Native American	North Carolina	Gas chamber	

== Demographics ==
Gender
Male	120	100%
Female	0	0%
Ethnicity
Black	70	58%
White	48	40%
Native American	2	2%
State
Ohio	15	13%
New York	14	12%
California	11	9%
North Carolina	10	8%
Georgia	8	7%
Texas	8	7%
Alabama	5	4%
District of Columbia	5	4%
Arkansas	4	3%
Florida	4	3%
Louisiana	4	3%
Indiana	3	3%
Kentucky	3	3%
Maryland	3	3%
Nevada	3	3%
Tennessee	3	3%
Washington	3	3%
Colorado	2	2%
Illinois	2	2%
Missouri	2	2%
New Jersey	2	2%
Pennsylvania	2	2%
South Carolina	2	2%
Iowa	1	1%
West Virginia	1	1%
Method
Electrocution	84	70%
Gas chamber	28	23%
Hanging	8	7%
Month
January	13	11%
February	15	13%
March	13	11%
April	10	8%
May	6	5%
June	9	8%
July	14	12%
August	10	8%
September	8	7%
October	3	3%
November	5	4%
December	14	12%
Age
Unknown	2	2%
10–19	4	3%
20–29	67	56%
30–39	24	20%
40–49	17	14%
50–59	6	5%
Total	120	100%

== Executions in recent years ==
Number of executions
1950	83
1949	120
1948	117
Total	320

Preceded by 1948	List of people executed in the United States in 1949	Succeeded by 1950
