= James Morelli =

Executed American murderer

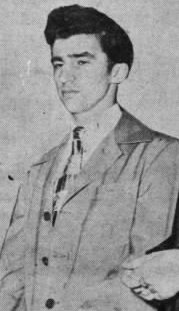
- James Morelli in 1948
- Born: March 18, 1927; Chicago, Illinois, U.S.
- Died: November 26, 1949 (aged 22); Cook County Jail, Illinois, U.S.
- Known for: "Mad Dog" mass murders
- Spouse: Genevieve Morelli
- Status: Executed by electrocution
- Conviction: Murder (2 counts)
- Penalty: Death
- Accomplices: Thomas Daley; Lowell Fentress

Details
- Victims: John Kuesis, 33; Theodore James Callis, 30; Emil Schmeichel, 30; Nick Kuesis, 19 (injured); Frank Baker, 19 (injured)
- Date: December 12–13, 1947
- Location: Chicago, Illinois
- Killed: 3
- Injured: 2

James Morelli (March 18, 1927 – November 26, 1949) was a gangster based in Chicago, Illinois, who was executed for participating alongside gangsters Thomas Daley and Lowell Fentress in the mass murder of three people. Several newspapers called the killings the "Mad Dog" murders. Although Morelli participated in three murders, he was only sentenced to death for the murder of one of the victims, 30-year-old Emil Schmeichel. Some reporters described Morelli's crime as "the worst Chicago mass killing since the Saint Valentine's Day massacre."

Morelli's execution was particularly noteworthy due to the presence of a reporter with the Chicago-based Herald-American who claimed to have photographed Morelli during his execution in the electric chair, making Morelli's electrocution one of very few rumored to be photographed.

== Early life ==
James Morelli was born to Fred Morelli and Dorothy Palermo on March 18, 1927, in Chicago. Prior to his death, he was married to Genevieve Morelli, with whom he had one daughter. Morelli reportedly held his infant daughter for the first time while he was in jail awaiting execution.

In 1944, Morelli was placed under a year of court supervision after being convicted of assault and battery. On February 23, 1945, Morelli was placed on five years of probation for armed robbery. Morelli was still on probation at the time of the murder.

== Murders ==
Forty-year-old Thomas Daley was the leader of a small street gang in which Morelli and 19-year-old Lowell Fentress were members. Daley decided to exact revenge against 33-year-old garage operator John Kuesis because Kuesis turned into a police informant and tipped police off to an $800 robbery that Daley and Fentress committed in September 1947. Daley and Fentress went to trial on robbery charges based on Kuesis's statement, but they were acquitted. After his arrest for the mass murders, Fentress confessed to the September robbery.

Daley brought Morelli and Fentress to Kuesis's garage on the night of December 12, 1947, initially with the intent to only beat Kuesis. Four other men who were friends and associates of Kuesis were present: Theodore James Callis, Emil Schmeichel, Frank Baker, and Kuesis's brother Nick. Morelli held the four men at gunpoint while Fentress and Daley beat John Kuesis. When Kuesis fought them both off, Daley ended the fight by shooting and killing Kuesis. Daley, Morelli, and Fentress decided to kill the other four men to eliminate all witnesses to the murder. They forced the four witnesses into their car and drove them around the Chicago suburbs for eight hours, shooting each one by one and then throwing their bodies out of the car to leave them for dead. Callis and Schmeichel died from their gunshot wounds, while Nick Kuesis and Baker survived with critical injuries. After his arrest, Fentress explained that he, Daley, and Morelli shot the other victims to eliminate witnesses to the murder of Kuesis.

== Arrests and death of Thomas Daley ==
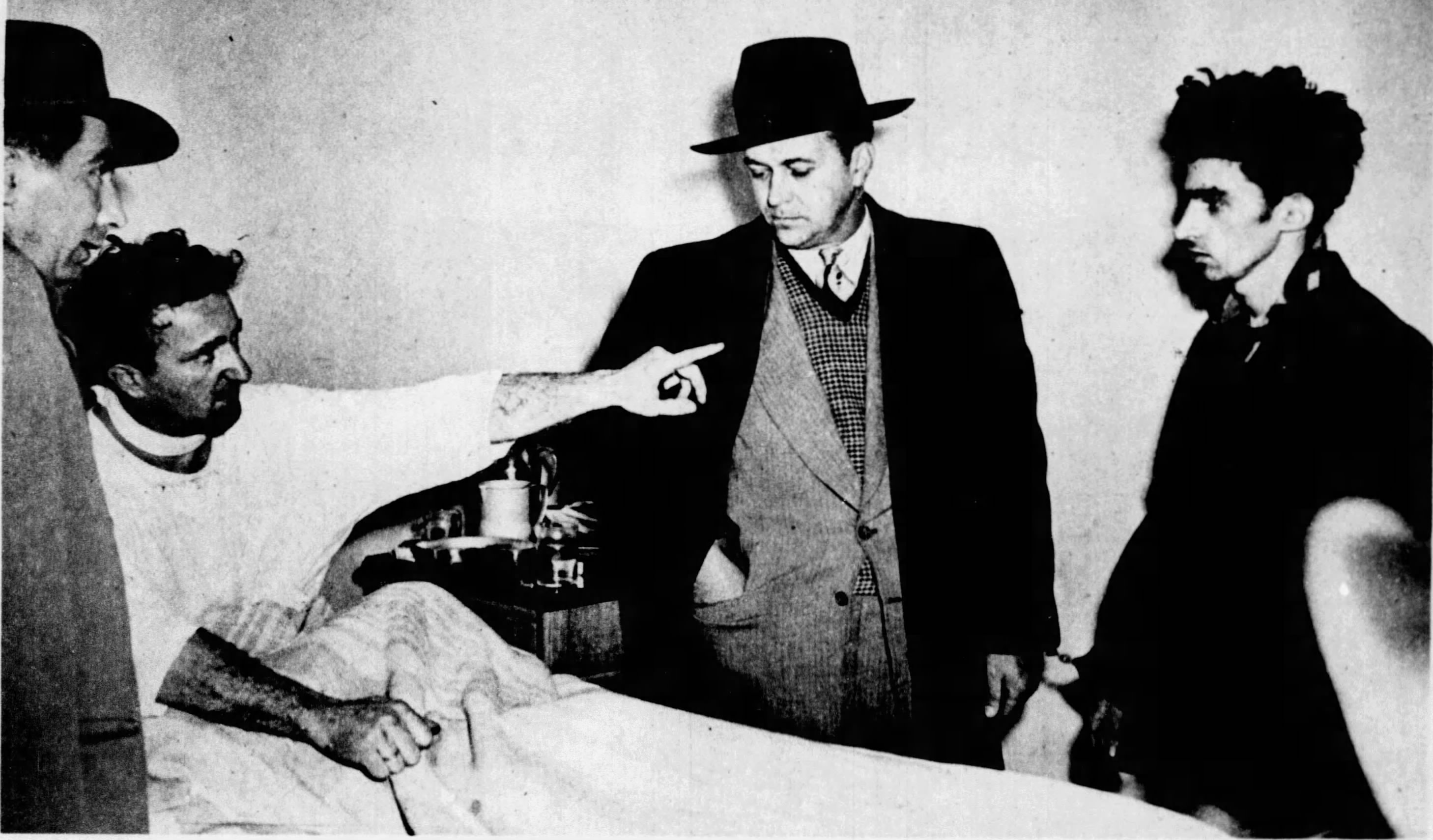
Nick Kuesis (pointing) identifies James Morelli (far right) as one of the men who attempted to kill him

After the murders, the gunmen discarded their weapons in a drainage canal. Fentress dropped off Morelli and Daley at Morelli's apartment, while Fentress went back to his own apartment. Later that night, police approached Fentress's apartment, where Fentress surrendered and gave authorities Morelli's address. When police approached Morelli's apartment, they found that Morelli had escaped, but Daley was still inside. Police shot Daley to death as he tried to escape through a window. Morelli surrendered the next day, on December 14, saying, "I'd rather sit in a jail cell than lie on a slab in the morgue."

After their arrests, Morelli and Fentress both claimed that Daley was the ringleader in their syndicate and that he had ordered the murders. Fentress also told investigators that Morelli had shot several of the victims, including Emil Schmeichel. On December 15, authorities declared that they considered Morelli and Fentress to be as criminally culpable as Daley and announced their intention to seek the death penalty against both Morelli and Fentress in each of the murders.

== Trials and sentences ==
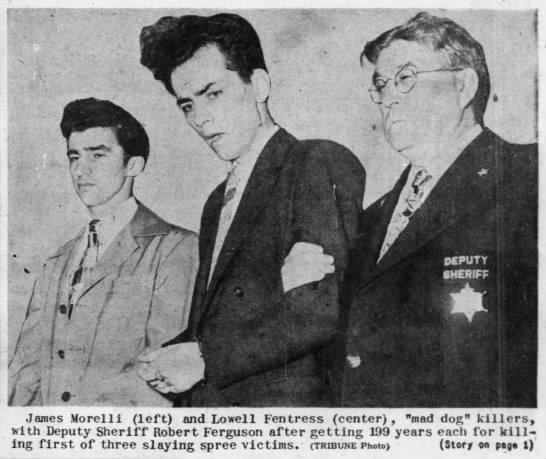
James Morelli (left) and Lowell Fentress (center), being escorted out of court in 1948 after the two were sentenced to 199 years in prison

The first trial to take place was the trial for the murder of John Kuesis. Nick Kuesis and Frank Baker testified against the defendants, while Morelli and Fentress maintained that Daley was the leader of their gang and had fired the shot that killed Kuesis. In spite of the state asking for the death penalty against Morelli and Fentress, both defendants received 199-year prison sentences after their convictions. One report stated that the jury deliberated for less than one hour, while another stated deliberations lasted a little more than 3 hours. After both Morelli and Fentress had their lives spared, the judge commented on Morelli's sentence, "If anyone should have 'burned,' as they say in the street, it is this young man."

In mid-January 1949, Morelli and Fentress went on trial for the murder of Emil Schmeichel, the second trial to take place. In a similar strategy to the first trial, Morelli and Fentress attempted to blame the murders entirely on Daley. The jury deliberated for nine hours before finding both guilty of Schmeichel's murder. This time, Fentress received another 199-year sentence in prison to be served consecutively with the first sentence, while Morelli was sentenced to death.

Morelli and Fentress were also charged with the murder of Theodore Callis, although they never went to trial for Callis's murder.

Lowell Fentress was paroled in 1974, after serving 27 years of his sentence. After his release, he established a foundation to assist other former inmates. In 1979, Fentress and another former inmate were interviewed about their time in prison. Fentress died in Indiana on October 28, 1996. He was 68 years old.

== Appeals and execution ==
After Morelli's appellate attorney Charles Bellows announced his intention to file an appeal challenging Morelli's conviction and death sentence to the Supreme Court of Illinois, a district court judge stayed Morelli's execution, delaying it from March 19 to May 14. The state Supreme Court ultimately rejected Morelli's appeal. Two days prior to the May 14 execution date, a judge granted Morelli a reprieve until August 12 to give him time to prepare for a July hearing before the Illinois pardon and parole board. On July 12, 1949, Morelli's hearing took place, in which he attempted to earn a commutation of his death sentence to life imprisonment. At the hearing, Morelli's attorneys attempted to argue for a new trial by claiming that Morelli's frequent characterization in local newspapers as a "mad dog" unfairly prejudiced him in the eyes of the jury. On July 25, the pardon and parole board rejected his plea for clemency, but Morelli soon received a second reprieve delaying his execution until September 23. Overall, Morelli received five stays before his execution date was finalized at November 25, 1949.

Thirty hours before Morelli's execution was scheduled to take place, two of his friends tried to smuggle hacksaws and a gun into the jail to help facilitate an escape attempt. Both friends were arrested. Morelli also offered to give his eyes to a blind man in exchange for lifelong financial aid to his soon-to-be-widowed wife and baby, which would have earned him an estimated extra 24 hours of life while doctors prepared him for a cornea transplant, but Illinois Attorney General John Boyle rejected Morelli's request.

Morelli was executed in the electric chair in the Cook County Jail at 12:08 a.m. on November 26, 1949, and pronounced dead two minutes later. He spoke no words in the death chamber, and his last words, spoken from his cell before he embarked on his walk to the execution chamber, were, "I have nothing to say." Morelli's execution had 154 official witnesses, the most out of any executions to occur at the Cook County Jail.

== Purported execution photograph ==
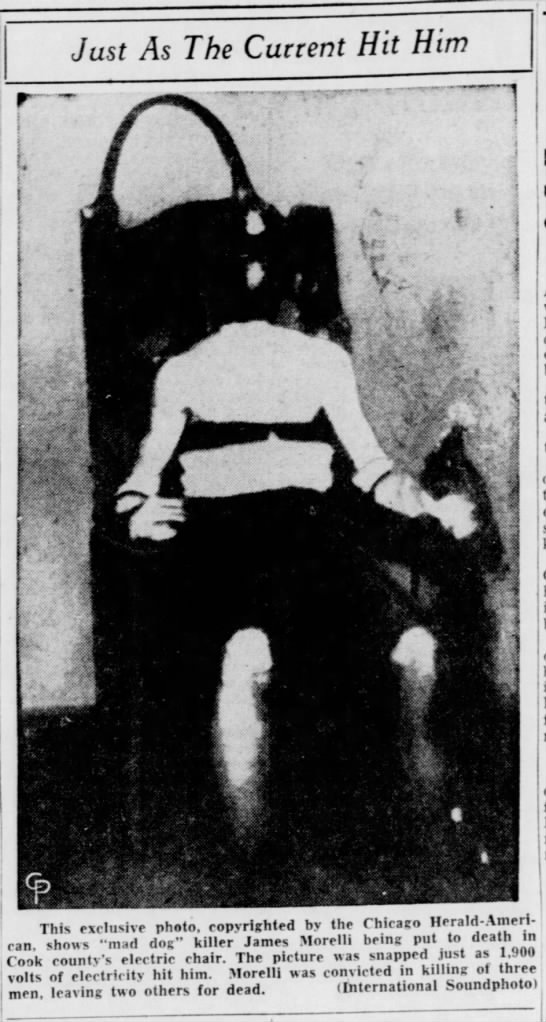
An untouched photograph purported to be of James Morelli's execution

The day following Morelli's execution, the Chicago-based newspaper Herald-American (now known as the Chicago American) ran a story on Morelli's execution featuring a front-page photograph purported to display Morelli as he sat in the electric chair being executed. Cook County Jail superintendent Chester L. Fordney declared the picture fake, disputing that any of the witnesses could have taken a picture because each witness was required to undergo inspection by the jail's "inspectoscope" to detect any contraband on them. Fordney insisted that any hidden cameras would have either been detected or fogged by the X-ray beam in the "inspectoscope." Instead, Fordney accused the Herald-American of painting a photorealistic body onto a picture of the Cook County electric chair and that the picture purported to be of Morelli contrasted press accounts of the execution. Fordney alleged that the picture of Morelli had no electrode on Morelli's right leg and disproportionately sized cables and chair fixtures. Fordney went as far as to place an aide in the clothes given to Cook County death row inmates before their executions, seat the aide in the electric chair, and photograph him to bolster his allegations.

The Herald-American insisted that two of their employees, Anthony Berardi and Joe Migon, hid a small Minox camera in a hole in Migon's shoe and sneaked it past the "inspectoscope." Berardi and Migon insisted that obscuring the camera in a hole protected it from the X-ray in the "inspectoscope." After guards escorted Morelli to the electric chair, Migon claimed that he removed his shoe, took the camera out of the hole in his insole, hid the camera in a handkerchief, and snapped four shots of Morelli seated in the chair at the moment the electricity began flowing. When asked to explain how they were able to sneak their camera past the Cook County Jail's security measures, then-Executive Editor George A. DeWitt said, "Why explain it? There may be more executions."

Morelli's execution was one of very few electric chair executions to ever be photographed, with others including Ruth Snyder in New York's Sing Sing Prison in 1928, and Willie Bragg, Mississippi's first electrocution in 1940.

== See also ==
- List of homicides in Illinois
- List of people executed in the United States in 1949
- Ruth Snyder, another person whose electric chair execution was photographed
- List of people executed by electrocution
