= Austin Nelson and Eugene LaMoore =

Last people executed in Alaska (died 1948 and 1950)

Austin Nelson
- Born: October 1, 1918; New Orleans, Louisiana, U.S.
- Died: March 1, 1948 (aged 29); Juneau Federal Jail, Juneau, Alaska, U.S.
- Cause of death: Execution by hanging
- Known for: Next-to-last person executed in Alaska's history
- Motive: Robbery
- Conviction: First degree murder
- Penalty: Death

Eugene LaMoore
- Born: February 22, 1904; Carbondale, Illinois, U.S.
- Died: April 14, 1950 (aged 46); Juneau Federal Jail, Juneau, Alaska, U.S.
- Cause of death: Execution by hanging
- Other names: Austin Rollan, Austin Eugene Rollin, Gene Rawlins
- Known for: Last person executed in Alaska's history
- Motive: Robbery
- Convictions: First degree murder Robbery
- Penalty: Death

Austin Archibald Nelson (October 1, 1918 – March 1, 1948) and Eugene R. LaMoore (February 22, 1904 – April 14, 1950) were the last two people to be judicially executed in the Territory of Alaska. Nelson and LaMoore were both convicted in separate trials of the December 1946 murder of Jim Ellen, a grocery store owner from Alaska's capital of Juneau, committed during a robbery of Ellen's store. Nelson's trial took place in 1947, and LaMoore testified in defense of Nelson's alibi before authorities connected him to Ellen's murder as well, leading to his own trial and conviction in 1948. Both men were sentenced to death. While Nelson was the second-to-last person executed in Alaska's history, LaMoore's execution two years later designated him as the final person to be executed in Alaska's history, as the then-territory abolished the death penalty in 1957 and never reinstated capital punishment after statehood in 1959.

Decades after their convictions, several legal historians and journalists, including Averil Lerman, Ed Schoenfeld, and Betsy Longenbaugh, retrospectively analyzed the condemned men's cases. Lerman found their trials to have been "riddled with misconduct and errors", and Lerman specifically said prosecutorial misconduct played a role in both Nelson's trial and LaMoore's subsequent trial. Lerman also stated that the executions of Nelson and LaMoore were emblematic of a pattern of racial discrimination in the application of the death penalty in Alaska, as Lerman identified that racial minorities, impoverished defendants, and defendants lacking access to adequate legal representation received comparatively harsher punishments than white defendants and wealthier defendants; Nelson and LaMoore were both African-American men. Lerman and Logenbaugh also posited that the controversy surrounding Nelson's and LaMoore's executions contributed to souring public perception against the death penalty in Alaska, leading to the institution's abolition seven years after LaMoore's hanging.

== Background ==
The murder victim, Jim Ellen, was a native of Greece. During his childhood, in 1909, he immigrated to the United States. Ellen was 53 years old at the time of his murder and had previously been married; his wife preceded him in death. Ellen was a World War I veteran, a member of the American Legion, and a member of the Juneau-based chapter of the Elks Lodge. Ellen moved to Juneau in approximately 1925. His store had been targeted in prior robbery attempts, including in 1937, 1938, and 1944, one of which involved Ellen fighting back against two armed men attempting to rob his store and successfully chasing them away following a physical altercation.

Austin Nelson was a laborer from Juneau, although he was initially born in New Orleans. Nelson did odd jobs around Juneau. Nelson was Catholic.

Eugene LaMoore, also a resident of Juneau, was born in Carbondale, Illinois. He once lived in San Francisco. At the time of his trial and execution, he was in his 40s and married to a woman from Tlingit Nation. The couple had at least three children. He went by the aliases Austin Rollan, Austin Eugene Rollin, and Gene Rawlins.

== Murder, investigation, and arrest ==
On December 22, 1946, Jim Ellen's body was found in the rear living quarters of his grocery and liquor store in Juneau. His throat had been slashed, and Ellen reportedly had a large sum of money that was unaccounted for after the murder. Locals stated Jim Ellen's murder "hit a nerve" because the crime conjured up anxieties and suspicions about the many strangers and drifters around Juneau in the post-war era.

Authorities connected Austin Nelson to the murder by virtue of a check they found on Ellen's store counter, written to Jim Ellen. Two days after Ellen's robbery and killing, authorities charged Nelson with first degree murder.

Nelson was appointed two attorneys ten days before his trial was scheduled to begin in April 1947. His first attorney was Henry Roden, who was in his 70s and was reportedly "too frail" to make the walk to the local jail to visit Nelson. His second attorney, Joseph McLean, had passed the bar examination two months prior to his appointment onto Nelson's case and was relatively inexperienced with law. During their investigation, the FBI, who conducted the probe into the case, considered covertly recording conversations between Nelson and his attorney due to his attorney experiencing hearing loss and therefore speaking loudly. A laboratory in Washington, D.C. advised against it.

== Austin Nelson's trial ==
Jury selection in Nelson's trial commenced on April 14, 1947. The prosecution presented their case starting April 15, 1947, and closed their case after four days. The prosecution's main witness was a woman named Marguerite Silvers, who had been arrested and held in jail for a month prior because she was a "material witness," which one prosecutor said was an "extremely unusual" move done for unknown reasons. Silvers testified to having seen Nelson in Ellen's shop on the night Ellen was murdered. Other witnesses confirmed that Nelson had ownership of a straight-edge razor that prosecutors posited was the murder weapon (although the actual murder weapon had never been found), and placed Nelson on the same street as Ellen's shop, Willoughby Street, on December 22, 1946.

Nelson's lead attorney, Roden, did not present an opening argument for his client. Nelson's defense was that he had an alibi and was not involved with Ellen's murder. His primary witness was his friend, Eugene LaMoore, who testified that he and Nelson had spent that night drinking in various bars and hotels and attempting to "collect a debt from a friend." A juror later stated that he found LaMoore's testimony credible at first, but after the prosecutor asked LaMoore if he had a criminal record and LaMoore answered dishonestly, the jury discredited his testimony: "We believed [LaMoore] when he testified the first time around [...] If anybody could have saved [Nelson's] neck, it was [LaMoore]." In addition to LaMoore's failed alibi, Nelson's team argued that prosecutors only had circumstantial evidence against him and had not addressed the fact that none of the stolen money had been found, that there was a bloody footprint on the ground that prosecutors did not introduce into evidence for an unknown reason, and that investigators had never located the murder weapon. On April 18, the jury convicted Nelson of first-degree murder; the same jury was given the choice to recommend a life sentence or a death sentence, and they sentenced Nelson to death. Before the judge handed down Nelson's death sentence, he protested his innocence and asked for a new trial, but due to his poverty, he never appealed. Alaska law also did not guarantee indigent condemned inmates the right to a public attorney for an appeal. Nelson made a clemency plea to President Harry S. Truman sometime in 1947, and Truman rejected clemency.

== Eugene LaMoore's trial ==
=== Investigation and arrest ===
During Nelson's trial, LaMoore was asked on the stand if he had any aliases, and he responded affirmatively. Prosecutors then asked him if he had a criminal record of prior felonies, and he responded that he did not have one; in reality, he had a prior robbery conviction stemming from a 1927 case in California, as well as a prior conviction in Juneau in January 1944 for selling alcohol without a license. The second conviction required LaMoore to pay a fine of $600 USD, and he was also given a suspended sentence of six months in prison. LaMoore gave his dishonest answer during one day of testimony and was called into court the next day to amend his testimony. After he gave his updated testimony, the FBI and Deputy US Marshal Walter G. Hellan arrested him for perjury and held him in the Federal Jail in Juneau on US$10,000 bond. The bond was unusually high for the time, and LaMoore could not afford the payment.

During his incarceration in jail, authorities interrogated him about Ellen's murder rather than the perjury charge. He did not have an attorney during these interrogations, and he was held in solitary confinement for several months, confined with leg irons and shackles, and occasionally a ball and chain, at all times unless being interviewed by law enforcement. LaMoore protested that he was innocent. In June 1947, Nelson gave a confession implicating LaMoore in the murder and telling FBI agents to search the bathroom in his boarding house, where they found US$1,151 and a straight-edge razor. Authorities then arranged for Nelson and LaMoore to meet in jail; at that point, Nelson was scheduled to be executed on July 1, 1947. Less than 24 hours prior to Nelson's scheduled execution, LaMoore submitted a typed confession admitting to involvement in Ellen's robbery, albeit stating that Nelson had committed the murder against LaMoore's wishes and that LaMoore only learned of the murder after exiting the store. LaMoore was then charged with first degree murder. LaMoore's confession led to a postponement of Nelson's hanging so that, per prosecutors, he could serve as an "indispensable witness" against LaMoore during his own murder trial: "it would be impossible to prove a murder charge against LaMoore without the testimony of said Austin Nelson".

=== Trial and appeals ===
LaMoore's trial began on February 2, 1948. He was appointed the same two attorneys Nelson had, Roden and McLean. The prosecution presented a case reliant on LaMoore's confession, which LaMoore recanted at trial; LaMoore and his attorneys also attempted to object to the confession's introduction at trial due to it "not [having] been shown satisfactorily that [the confession] was made freely and voluntarily, without any promise or any threats towards appellant," and the judge overruled the objection. Similarly to Nelson's case, prosecutors did not introduce a murder weapon or the money from the robbery. A police officer testified that the bloody footprints on Ellen's store's floor appeared to match LaMoore's shoe size, but prosecutors never introduced into evidence the linoleum tiles cut out of the floor containing the footprints.

LaMoore testified at his own trial, arguing that he gave his confession in part because Nelson had begged LaMoore to help save his life as his scheduled execution date was approaching: "[Nelson] would not sit down. He stood behind his chair and cried and called himself many dirty names. He told me to forgive him, 'but help me save my life.' It hurts me to say this. He said, 'Help me save my life. It will come out all right'." During his own testimony, LaMoore also accused officials of "fram[ing]" Nelson and using dishonest means to extract LaMoore's own confession. Prosecutors countered by stating that LaMoore voluntarily made a confession to attorney Herbert L. Faulkner, who typed the confession down while LaMoore verbally dictated it, and Deputy US Marshal Hellan, who also witnessed Faulkner read the confession back to LaMoore and witnessed LaMoore signing the confession, and that his confession was not given under duress. LaMoore testified that Faulkner had given him legal advice to confess, which Faulkner denied. Marguerite Silvers, who had previously testified to seeing Nelson in Ellen's store, testified during LaMoore's trial that she only saw one person in the store on the night of the murder and did not see LaMoore in Ellen's store; the prosecutor responded by accusing Silvers of being "a drunk" and an unreliable witness. Nelson was never called to testify against LaMoore despite prosecutors previously designating him a material witness. After the prosecution finished presenting evidence, LaMoore's attorneys requested that the confession be stricken from the record, and this request was denied.

LaMoore's trial lasted three days, with the Associated Press later labeling his trial "one of the shortest trials of its kind in history". During their deliberations, jurors submitted a note asking the judge to determine LaMoore's sentence, and the judge replied that determining a sentence was their responsibility. After five hours of deliberations, the jury returned with a guilty verdict and sentenced LaMoore to death.

Soon after receiving his death sentence, LaMoore pleaded for executive clemency from Alaska's acting territorial governor, Llewellyn Morris "Lew" Williams. In April 1948, Governor Williams announced he would not offer LaMoore executive clemency, which would have reduced LaMoore's sentence to life imprisonment. At the time, LaMoore was scheduled to be hanged on April 30, 1948, but he was able to appeal, postponing the execution of his sentence.

LaMoore appealed his death sentence on the grounds that his confession was illegally obtained and involuntary and, therefore, he deserved a new trial due to his trial's judge not sustaining his objection or approving his motion to strike. On January 13, 1950, the United States Court of Appeals for the Ninth Circuit upheld his conviction and death sentence. Following the unsuccessful appeal, in March 1950, Judge George W. Folta scheduled LaMoore's execution to take place the next month on April 14, 1950.

== Executions ==
Less than a week after the conclusion of LaMoore's trial, Nelson's execution was scheduled to take place on March 1, 1948. Witnesses to Nelson's execution stated that he fought guards on his way to the gallows and left Deputy U.S. Marshal Sidney Thompson with a black eye. After the trap door dropped at 5:40 am, Nelson took approximately 11 minutes to die. Nelson's execution was under federal jurisdiction because of Alaska's status as a territory, which meant that federal officials presided over the execution.

Like Nelson's execution, LaMoore's execution was under federal jurisdiction because of Alaska's status as a territory. LaMoore was executed on April 14, 1950. Authorities constructed a temporary gallows structure outside Juneau's federal jail to carry out the execution. In his final statement, LaMoore stated, "I did not kill Jim Ellen. I have never taken innocent blood." Reporters interpreted from LaMoore's final statement that he "indirectly implied that he had killed on other occasions." He dropped through the trap door at 5:16 am, and physicians pronounced him dead at 5:31 am.

== Aftermath, analysis, abolition ==
In May 1950, one month after LaMoore's execution, LaMoore's five-year-old son Gene accidentally shot and killed his three-year-old sister Yvonne with a rifle. LaMoore's wife placed their remaining children into an orphanage and died at a relatively young age. LaMoore's sister adopted two of their children, but authorities denied her request to adopt a third because, unlike LaMoore's sister, who was black, the third child's skin was light enough for her to pass as white.

Journalist Betsy Logenbaugh expressed her belief in 2018 that both defendants in Ellen's murder case were executed "because authorities could not discern who actually killed Ellen," calling the executions "injustices" and, like Lerman, citing the controversy around their cases, as well as the disproportionate application of the death penalty in Alaska against defendants who were racial minorities, as contributing factors in the abolition of Alaska's death penalty in 1957. Vic Fischer and Warren A. Taylor, Alaskan Territorial legislators, argued in favor of abolishing the death penalty during a legislative session in 1957. Taylor drafted the bill to abolish the death penalty and gave a speech before the Legislature summarizing Alaska's death penalty history, the racial disparity in the application of death sentences (given that of the eight men hanged in the Territory's history, only two were white despite the majority of Alaska's convicted murderers being white), and "the shoddy evidence and procedures that sent the men to death, in cases that no jury would convict today." The measure passed by a vote of 14–5.

Anchorage, Alaska-based attorney and historian Averil Lerman noted that there were "many other homicides in Juneau and Southeast Alaska" between 1939 – the year Alaska hanged Nelson Charles, a Native American man – and 1950, yet none of the perpetrators aside from Charles, Nelson, and LaMoore were executed. In one particular case, a white man named George Meeks was convicted of the 1948 robbery and murder of a construction worker in a trial overseen by Robert Boochever, one of the same prosecutors who had obtained death sentences against Nelson and LaMoore, but Meeks was sentenced to life imprisonment; in a 1995 interview with Lerman, Boochever stated his belief that Meeks would have been hanged if he had been black like Nelson and LaMoore. In a separate 2009 interview, Lerman stated that she believed LaMoore "may have been innocent, and he certainly was not guilty beyond a reasonable doubt."

In 2018, Logenbaugh and Ed Schoenfeld, both of whom were Juneau-based journalists, organized a tour called "Capital City Killers" focusing on crime in Juneau. The tour designated the Juneau-Douglas City Museum as the tour's first stop because the museum was to serve as a stand-in for the location where Nelson and LaMoore were hanged.

== See also ==
- Capital punishment in Alaska
- List of people executed in the United States in 1948
- List of people executed in the United States in 1950
- List of most recent executions by jurisdiction
