= Frank H. Richards =

American politician

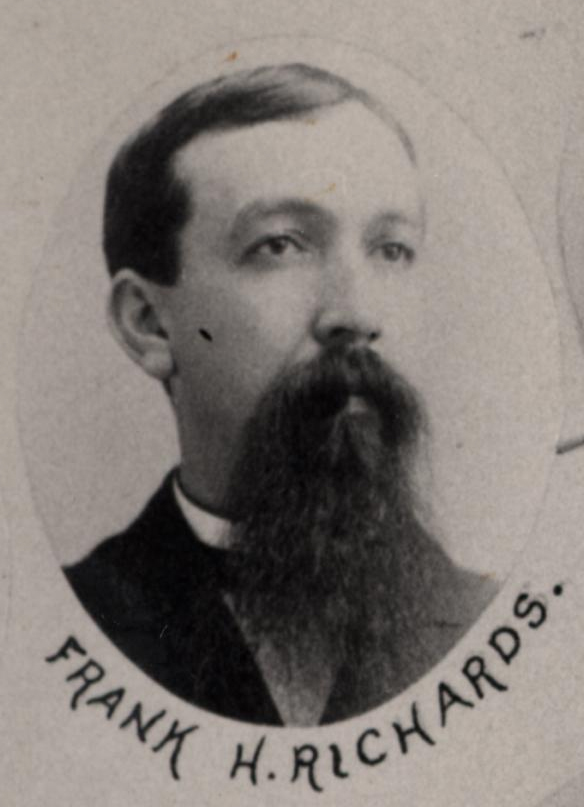
- Richards in 1891

Member of the Washington Senate from the 34th district
- In office January 27, 1891 – January 14, 1895
- Preceded by: Morris McCarty
- Succeeded by: C. W. Dorr

Personal details
- Born: March 21, 1858 McHenry County, Illinois, U.S.
- Died: November 13, 1937 (aged 79) Carlsbad, New Mexico, U.S.
- Party: Republican
- Spouse: Bessie Wilke

Frank H. Richards (March 21, 1858 – November 13, 1937) was an American politician in the state of Washington. He served in the Washington State Senate from 1891 to 1895. He was named to the Senate when Morris McCarty was unseated by that same body.

Richards later served as a U.S. Marshal to the Second Judicial District of Alaska. He was removed from office by President Theodore Roosevelt in 1904. On October 8, 1903, he married Bessie Wilke, of Chicago, Illinois. In November 1937, Richards was reported to be seriously ill with pneumonia. He died later that month, aged 79.
