= Robert Shulman (serial killer) =

American serial killer

- Mugshot (taken c. 1996)
- Born: Robert Yale Shulman; March 28, 1954; New York, U.S.
- Died: April 13, 2006 (aged 52); Albany Medical Center, Albany, New York, U.S.
- Status: Deceased
- Convictions: First degree murder Second degree murder (4 counts)
- Penalty: Suffolk County: Death; commuted to life imprisonment Westchester County: 25 years-to-life imprisonment

Details
- Victims: 5+
- Span of crimes: 1991–1995
- Country: United States
- State: New York
- Date apprehended: April 6, 1996

Robert Yale Shulman (March 28, 1954 – April 13, 2006) was an American serial killer who murdered at least five young women in Hicksville, New York from 1991 to 1995. Convicted and sentenced to death for one of the murders and to life imprisonment for the others, his death sentence was later commuted to life imprisonment and he died in prison in 2006.

== Early life ==
Robert Yale Shulman was born on March 28, 1954, in upstate New York, as one of four children born to Jules and Mildred Shulman. Growing up in a Jewish family with three brothers, he spent his youth in the cities of Long Beach and Westbury on Long Island, in what were considered to be relatively good, middle-class neighborhoods.

There are conflicting accounts about Shulman's upbringing. While his parents were law-abiding and did not have any notable bad habits that affected the family, they were both described as indifferent towards their children, leading some of the brothers to develop anti-social behavior. In later years, only the eldest of Robert's brothers - Shelly - would not demonstrate such behavior and go on to have a successful career in the educational sector.

=== Teenage years and early adulthood ===
In the mid-1960s, Shulman's father Jules fell ill with Hodgkin lymphoma, eventually succumbing to complications from it in 1967. The death greatly affected Robert and his older brother Steven, both of whom were particularly traumatized by it, with Robert occasionally threatening to kill himself. Robert attended the W. T. Clarke High School, graduating in 1972. As he did not participate in sports or any other sociable activity, he was unpopular at school and with the neighborhood children, with Shelly later describing him as a shy, withdrawn man.

Also according to Shelly, both Robert and Steven started abusing drugs and having outbursts of anger in the late 1960s and early 1970s, often over small, inconsequential matters. At Shelly's request, the two brothers sought counseling in the early-to-mid 1970s, but it apparently had little effect. After the death of her husband, Mildred met a man from the "Parents Without Partners" organization and married him five days later. People acquainted with the family would later say that their mother preferred to attend social events and parties than to tend to her children or clean the house, leaving it in a state of extreme disrepair, with cobwebs on the walls, lots of unwashed dirty dishes and uncooked food. One of Shulman's attorneys would claim later on that Mildred had always wanted a daughter and apparently dressed up his younger brother Barry in girl's clothing and introduced him as her daughter, but these claims were never substantiated.

=== Move to Hicksville ===
After graduating from high school, Shulman enrolled at Hofstra University, but quickly lost interest and dropped out after two years, after which he began working for USPS in 1974. Two years later, his mother died of a heart attack, and the year after that, Steven committed suicide.

In the mid-1980s, Robert and his younger brother Barry moved to Hicksville, where they rented two apartments in the same private home (owned by an elderly, hearing-impaired woman) at 10 Glow Lane and found jobs at the local postal service on West John Street, where they worked different shifts. Neighbors and acquaintances had mixed characterizations of Robert during this period, with many describing him as overtly introverted and never interacting with anyone. Shulman was not popular with women and never married, and instead spent most of his time in the local red-light district.

== Victims ==
Between August 1991 and December 1995, Shulman is known to have murdered at least five prostitutes. He often picked up his victims from a street corner in Hollis, Queens, and then brought them to his apartment, where they smoked crack cocaine and had sex. Afterwards, he would proceed to beat them to death with barbells, a hammer or baseball bat, and then dismember the bodies in the bathroom. The remains were then sealed in plastic garbage bags and dumped in various neighboring cities.

In order to prevent fingerprint identification, Shulman always cut off the hands of the murdered women, which he buried deep underground separately from other remains.

=== Lori Vasquez ===
Vasquez was a 24-year-old who lived in Brooklyn. Her body was found on August 31, 1991, inside a dumpster in Yonkers. Robert Shulman's brother, Barry, was convicted of disposing of Vasquez's body.

=== Meresa Hammonds ===
Meresa Hammonds was a 31-year-old who lived in New Jersey. She was born in April 1961 in Kentucky as one of seven siblings, and had previously spent time in California and Michigan before moving to New Jersey where she had worked as a fashion model with her sister and left behind two sons. Her initially unidentified body was discovered on June 27, 1992, in a dumpster in Yonkers. She was referred to as "Yonkers Jane Doe" before being identified in December 2021.

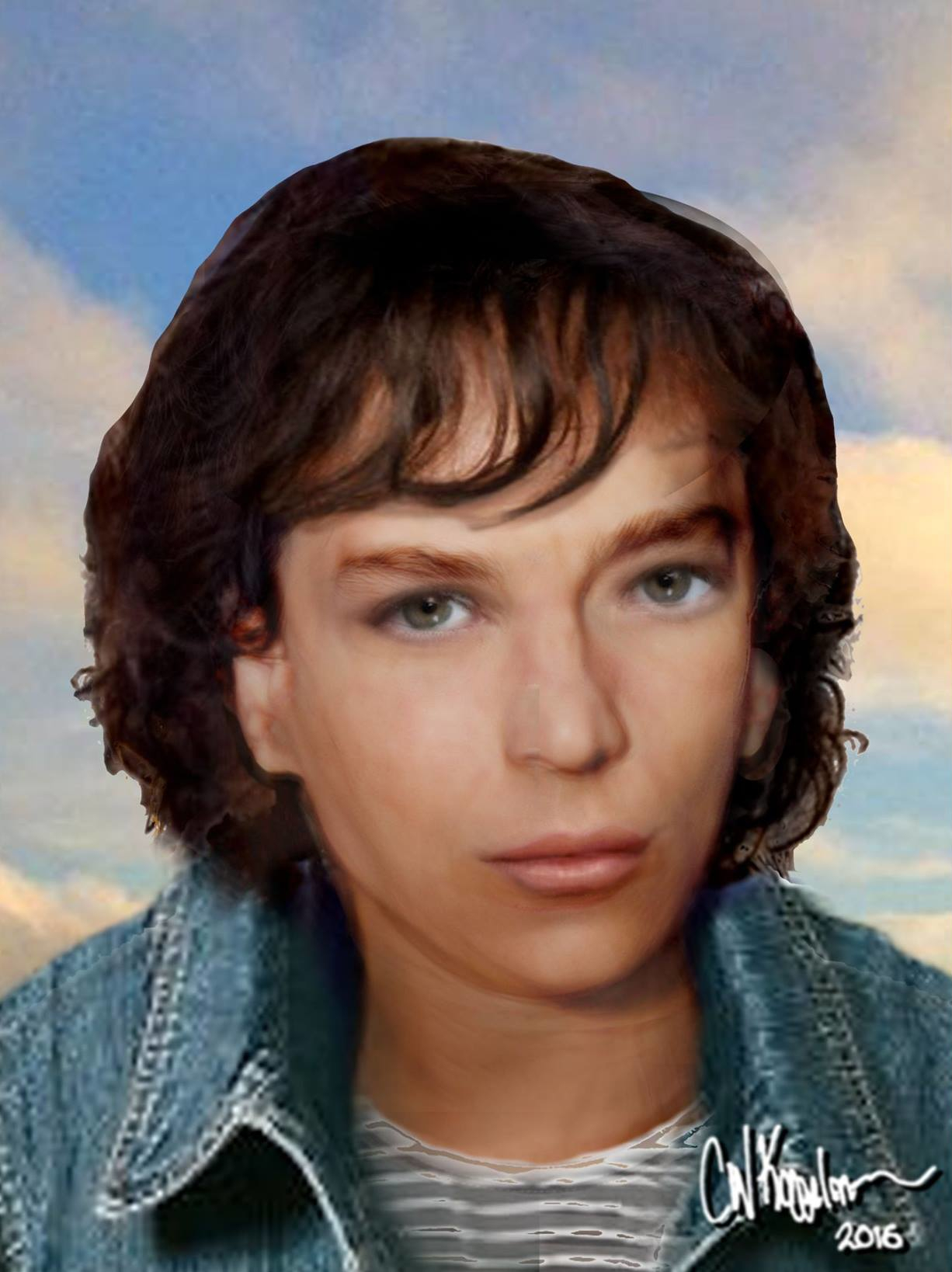
Reconstruction by Carl Koppelman of Meresa Hammonds

=== Medford Jane Doe ===
On December 7, 1994, an unidentified woman was found on the shoulder of Long Island Avenue by an employee of the Suffolk County Department of Public Works between Yaphank and Medford. She had a tattoo on her left arm depicting a red heart and a banner with the name "Adrian". She had been beaten and dismembered.

=== Lisa Ann Warner ===
Warner was an 18-year-old who lived in Jamaica, Queens. Her body was found on April 6, 1995, at a recycling plant in Brooklyn. She had been beaten and dismembered. Investigators determined that her remains had been placed in a dumpster on a property in Nassau County before ending up in a garbage truck.

=== Kelly Sue Bunting ===
Bunting, also known as "Melani", was a 28-year-old who lived in Hollis. She was last seen alive on December 8, 1995. Her body was found in Melville wrapped in a sleeping bag. Her hands had been removed.

While initially unidentified, Bunting had a lot of tattoos, for which the Suffolk County District Attorney's Office contacted the NYPD and showed them photographs of the tattoos in the hope that the victim had a prior criminal record and that they would be recorded as distinctive markings. In March 1996, the NYPD had a match and the victim was identified as Bunting.

== Investigation ==
Looking for the murder site, a detective canvassing hotels heard about a man driving a blue Cadillac who cruised the area. Trying to track the man down with this information, women were located who led them not to a hotel, but to a residence where a blue Cadillac was seen. The registration was obtained, and the car was registered to Shulman's brother.

Trying to get information about the sleeping bag in which Bunting was found, detectives learned Sears was the only manufacturer. Sears was contacted to see if the brother had purchased one with a credit card. Sears said the brother had no card, but pointed out that Shulman had a card. This was how police were initially pointed towards Shulman as a possible culprit.

Women later identified him as the man cruising in the Cadillac, and cadaver dogs signaled the possibility of dead remains having been present in the Cadillac. Police searched Shulman's work place and found trace evidence matching that found on the body. Shulman was arrested near his home on April 6, 1996. After interrogation, Shulman had a nervous breakdown and confessed to the three murders. (Shulman confessed to the earliest two murders at a later date.) A search of his room revealed hundreds of bloodstains scattered over almost every surface.

Barry Shulman was also questioned after Robert's arrest. During interrogation, he unexpectedly admitted that he knew about his brother's criminal activities and had, at various times over the years, helped him remove and dispose of remains from his apartment. Despite this, he denied directly participating in the murders, and on April 26, 1996, he was indicted for aiding and abetting a felony.

== Trials ==
=== Suffolk County ===
Following his arrest, Shulman was charged with the three murders committed in Suffolk County, before being transported to Westchester County, where he would be tried for the two murders committed there. Prosecutors in both counties filed a motion for the charges to be consolidated into one trial, but the court denied this motion.

After his arrest, Shulman's mental condition worsened and he became severely depressed, with a psychologist diagnosing him with suicidal ideation. While awaiting trial at the Suffolk County Jail, he was placed on suicide watch. Layering the groundwork for a possible insanity plea, one of Shulman's attorneys, Anthony J. Colleluori, argued that his client suffered from mental illness since the mid-1970s due to the deaths of his mother and brother, after which he himself was placed in psychiatric care. During his arraignment in Suffolk County, the attorney filed a motion to release Shulman on bail, but this was denied after it was discovered that Shulman had more than $300,000 in his bank accounts. This was considered puzzling, as his yearly income from the postal service was about $34,000, and he was not known to have any other alternative means of income, but Shulman refused to explain where he had gotten the money from.

In 1997, at the request of his attorneys, Shulman was committed to a psychiatric clinic for a forensic psychiatric evaluation, which ultimately found him to be sane and able to stand trial. The Suffolk County trial began in December 1998, and lasted five months. In said trial, Robert's attorneys - Paul Gianelli and William Keahon - argued that Barry Shulman was the true culprit, citing some circumstantial evidence against him. One example was that cat hair was found on the remains of two victims, which corresponded to the hair of Barry's pet cat. They also attempted to cast doubt on their client's confession, claiming it was made under duress. Keahon argued that one of the investigators, after learning about Shulman's alleged mental health issues, supposedly introduced himself as a lawyer who could help Robert get psychiatric help if he signed the confession.

These claims were disputed by the Suffolk County Assistant District Attorney Georgia Tschiember, who insisted that Shulman voluntarily confessed to the murders. On March 5, 1999, he was found guilty of the murders of the Medford Jane Doe, Bunting and Warner, with prosecutors requesting that he be sentenced to death under the state's newly enacted death penalty statutes introduced on September 1, 1995. On July 13, Shulman was sentenced to death by lethal injection and had an execution date set for August 30, but this was postponed after his defense attorneys appealed. Shortly after hearing the verdict, Shulman burst into tears.

=== Westchester County ===
In late 1999, Shulman was transferred to Westchester County, where he would be tried for the murders of Hammonds (then still known as a Jane Doe) and Vasquez. On January 4, 2000, he pleaded guilty to the crimes, and since both killings took place before the new death penalty statute became law, he was instead sentenced to 25-years-to-life imprisonment.

=== Barry's conviction ===
In January 2000, Barry Shulman was convicted of aiding and abetting his brother's crimes, and was sentenced to two years imprisonment. His sentence sparked outrage by members of the District Attorney's Office and the victims' relatives, who felt it was too lenient. District Attorney James M. Catterson, who recommended that Barry should be sentenced to 4 2/3 to 14 years imprisonment, said that he could be paroled in nine-to-ten months under the current sentence. Catterson pointed to the fact that Barry knowingly never reported the crimes to the police and actively assisted in destroying evidence of Robert's crimes, and as such, he should receive an appropriately harsh sentence.

== Imprisonment and death ==
In 2004, the New York Court of Appeals ruled that the death penalty was unconstitutional, after which Shulman's death sentence was commuted to life imprisonment. In the mid-2000s, he was transferred to the Clinton Correctional Facility in Dannemora to serve the remainder of his sentences.

In early April 2006, Shulman complained of feeling unwell and was transported to the Champlain Valley Physicians Hospital in Plattsburgh. A few hours later, his physical condition deteriorated rapidly, after which he was rushed to the Albany Medical Center in Albany, where he died on April 13, aged 52. His cause of death was ruled to be from natural causes.

== See also ==
- List of serial killers in the United States
- Capital punishment in New York
