= Hopewell, Covington County, Mississippi =

Hopewell, Mississippi
- Unincorporated community
- Location within Mississippi Location within the United States
- Coordinates: 31°43′06″N 89°28′15″W
- Country: United States
- State: Mississippi
- County: Covington
- Elevation: 407 ft (124 m)
- Time zone: UTC-6 (Central (CST))
  - Summer (DST): UTC-5 (CDT)
- Area codes: 601 & 769
- GNIS feature ID: 710648

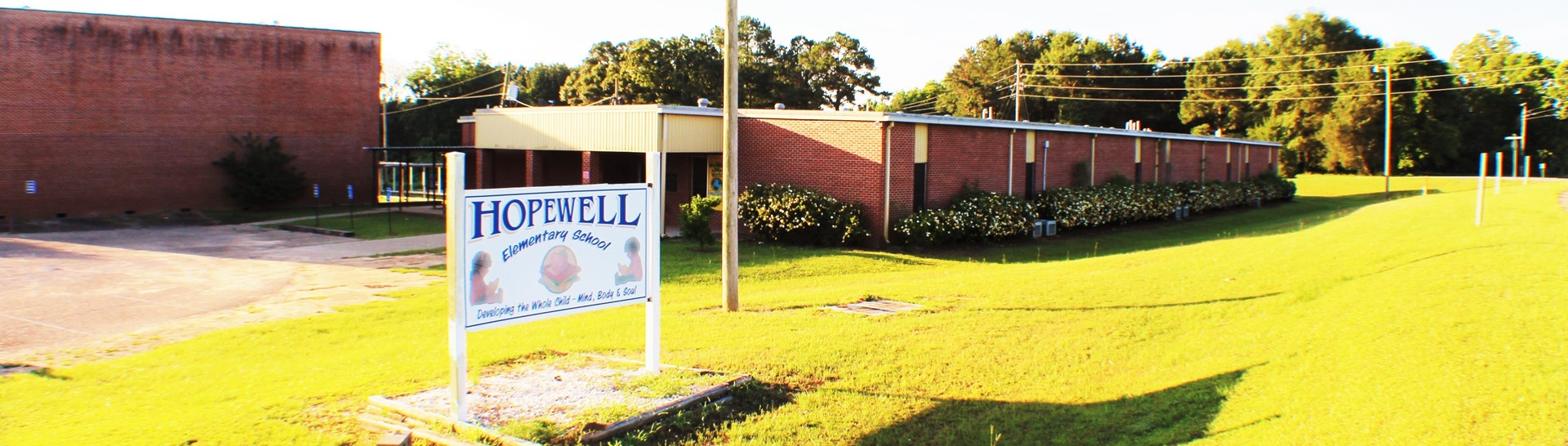
Hopewell Elementary School

Hopewell is an unincorporated community in Covington County, Mississippi, United States.

== History ==
One of the oldest settlements in Covington County, one of Hopewell's earliest settlers was Thomas Ates, who bought land from the Choctaw Natives. Ben and Mary Duckworth were also early settlers, and named the town after the Biblical account of Moses' and Abraham's definition of hope: "to trust, expect, await, and endure". Many emancipated slaves settled in Hopewell after the Civil War.

The New Hopewell School was constructed in 1885, and was located several miles north of the town, at the present site of the New Hopewell Church and Cemetery. The school operated until 1950.

In 1922, Covington County authorities created the Hopewell Colored Separate School District in response to petitions by black citizens for improved educational opportunities. Two years later, Hopewell's black residents sued Covington County after they realized they were being "doubly taxed" by the county. The boundaries of the Colored district encompassed only black-owned properties, while the larger boundaries of the white school district–created over a decade earlier–encompassed both white and black-owned properties. The citizens lost their lawsuit; the judge ruling that it was happenstance that all blacks but no whites lived in both school districts. Furthermore, any whites who bought property in the Hopewell district would also bear this double burden.

In the 1920s, a second school was constructed in Hopewell. It was built as a Rosenwald School, and is still in operation, now called Hopewell Elementary School.

In 1966, a desegregation lawsuit was filed alleging that the school district had failed to integrate the predominantly black Hopewell Attendance Center with predominantly white Seminary Attendance Center. The lawsuit languished until 2006, when the school board and the U.S. Department of Justice agreed on a plan which angered both blacks and whites because of the increased distances students would need to travel. Several citizens went to court to contest the 40-year-old desegregation order.
