= Raymond Fernandez and Martha Beck =

American serial killer couple

Raymond Fernandez
- Born: December 17, 1914; Territory of Hawaii
- Died: March 8, 1951 (aged 36); Ossining, New York, U.S.
- Occupation: Confidence trickster
- Children: 4
- Status: Executed by electrocution
- Conviction: First-degree murder
- Penalty: Death

Details
- Victims: 3–20
- Span of crimes: 1947–1949
- Country: United States
- States: Michigan and New York

Martha Beck
- Born: Martha Jule Seabrook; May 6, 1920; Milton, Florida, U.S.
- Died: March 8, 1951 (aged 30); Ossining, New York, U.S.
- Occupation: Nurse
- Children: 2
- Status: Executed by electrocution
- Conviction: First-degree murder
- Penalty: Death

Details
- Victims: 3–20
- Span of crimes: 1947–1949
- Country: United States
- States: New York and Michigan

Raymond Martinez Fernandez (December 17, 1914 – March 8, 1951) and Martha Jule Beck (May 6, 1920 – March 8, 1951) were an American serial killer couple. They were convicted of one murder, are known to have committed two more, and were suspected of having killed up to twenty victims during a spree between 1947 and 1949.

After their arrest and trial for serial murder in 1949, Fernandez and Beck became known as the Lonely Hearts Killers for meeting their unsuspecting victims through personal ads, posted in newspaper lonely hearts columns. A number of films and television shows are based on this case.

== Before the murders ==
=== Raymond Fernandez ===
Raymond Martinez Fernandez was born in the Territory of Hawaii to Spanish parents on December 17, 1914. Shortly after, the family moved to Bridgeport, Connecticut. As a teenager, Fernandez worked on his uncle's farm in Spain, married a young local woman named Encarnación Robles and had four children, all of whom he abandoned later in life.

He served in the Spanish merchant navy and with British intelligence services during World War II.

Upon his release from a hospital, Fernandez stole some clothing and was imprisoned for a year, during which time his cellmate converted him to a belief in voodoo and black magic. Fernandez later claimed black magic gave him irresistible power and charm over women.

=== Martha Beck ===
Martha Beck was born Martha Jule Seabrook on May 6, 1920, in Milton, Florida. Allegedly due to a glandular problem, then a common explanation for obesity, Beck was overweight and underwent puberty prematurely. At her trial, she claimed to have been raped by her brother and subsequently beaten by her mother.

Anecdotal evidence suggests that, as a teenager, Beck ran away to the home of an uncle in another town, taking Truman Capote, then 10 years old, with her, and that they were found and returned home after a day. Capote made the claim in a 1957 interview in The Paris Review, without using Beck's name but claiming he ran away from home "with a girl much older than myself" who later achieved infamy as the Lonely Hearts Killer and was executed at Sing Sing.

After finishing school, Beck studied nursing but had trouble finding a job due to her weight. She initially became an undertaker's assistant and prepared female bodies for burial. She soon quit that job and moved to California, where she worked in a United States Army hospital as a nurse. While living in California she eventually became pregnant, but the father of the baby refused to marry her. Single and pregnant, at a time when a strong social stigma existed concerning out-of-wedlock childbirth, Beck returned to Florida.

Beck claimed that her child's father had been killed in the Pacific Campaign. The town mourned her loss and the story was published in the local newspaper. Shortly after her daughter was born, she became pregnant again by a Pensacola bus driver named Alfred Beck. They married quickly and divorced six months later. She gave birth to a son.

Unemployed and the single mother of two young children, Beck escaped into a fantasy world, buying romance magazines and novels, and watching romantic movies. In 1946, she found employment at the Pensacola Hospital for Children. She placed a lonely hearts ad in 1947, which Raymond Fernandez answered.

== Murders ==
Fernandez visited Beck and stayed for a short time; she told everyone they were to be married. He returned to New York City while she made preparations in Florida. When she was abruptly fired from her job, Beck packed her belongings and arrived on Fernandez's doorstep in New York.

Fernandez enjoyed the way she catered to his every whim, and when he learned she had left her children for him, he thought it was a sign of an unconditional love. He confessed his criminal enterprises to Beck, who quickly sent her children to the Salvation Army in order to devote herself to Fernandez without any distractions.

Beck posed as Fernandez's sister, giving him an air of respectability. Their victims, feeling more secure knowing there was another woman in the house, often agreed to stay with the pair. Beck convinced some victims that she lived alone and that her "brother" was only a guest. She was extremely jealous and went to great lengths to make sure Fernandez and his "intended" never consummated their relationship. When he had sex with a woman, Beck subjected both to her violent temper.

In 1949, the pair committed the three murders for which they later were convicted. Janet Fay, 66, became engaged to Fernandez and went to stay at his Long Island apartment. When Beck caught her in bed with Fernandez, she struck Fay's head with a hammer. Fernandez then strangled Fay. Her family became suspicious when she disappeared, and Fernandez and Beck fled.

Beck and Fernandez traveled to Byron Center Road in Wyoming Township, Michigan, a suburb of Grand Rapids, where they met and stayed with Delphine Downing, a 28-year-old widow with a two-year-old daughter. On February 28, Downing became agitated and Fernandez gave her sleeping pills to calm her. The daughter witnessed Downing's resulting stupor and began to cry, which enraged Beck. Panicked, Beck strangled the child but did not kill her.

Fernandez thought Downing would become suspicious if she saw her bruised daughter, so he shot the unconscious woman. The couple then stayed for several days in Downing's house. Again enraged by the daughter's crying, Beck drowned her in a basin of water. They buried the bodies in the basement. Suspicious neighbors reported the disappearance of the Downings, leading the police to arrive at the door on March 1, 1949, and arrest Beck and Fernandez.

== Trial and executions ==
Fernandez quickly confessed. The pair vehemently denied committing 17 murders that were attributed to them, and Fernandez tried to retract his confession, saying he made it only to protect Beck. They were extradited to New York, which still instituted the death penalty. Fay's murder was the only one for which the couple were tried, and they were both sentenced to death. They were executed by electric chair at Sing Sing prison on March 8, 1951.

== In media ==
- "Lonely Hearts Killers", a 1960 episode of the American TV show Deadline, released on DVD in 2019
- The Honeymoon Killers, 1970 American cult classic about the same events
- Deep Crimson, 1996 Mexican film about the same events
- Lonely Hearts, 2006 American film about the same events
- Alleluia, 2014 Belgian-French film inspired by the same events
- A 2006 episode of the TV series Cold Case was called "Lonely Hearts", featuring a pair of killers named Martha Puck and Ramon Delgado.
- A 2023 episode of the TV series Inside No. 9, "Love Is a Stranger", about an online dating agency, featured the "Lonely Hearts Killer".

== See also ==
- Capital punishment in New York
- List of homicides in Michigan
- List of people executed in New York
- List of people executed by electrocution
- List of people executed in the United States in 1951
- List of serial killers by number of victims
- List of serial killers in the United States
- Romance scam

== Sources ==
- Lane, Brian and Gregg, Wilfred [1992]. The Encyclopedia Of Serial Killers. Berkley Books.
- Fuchs, Christian [1996] (2002). Bad Blood. Creation Books.
