= Capital punishment in New York =

History of the death penalty in New York State

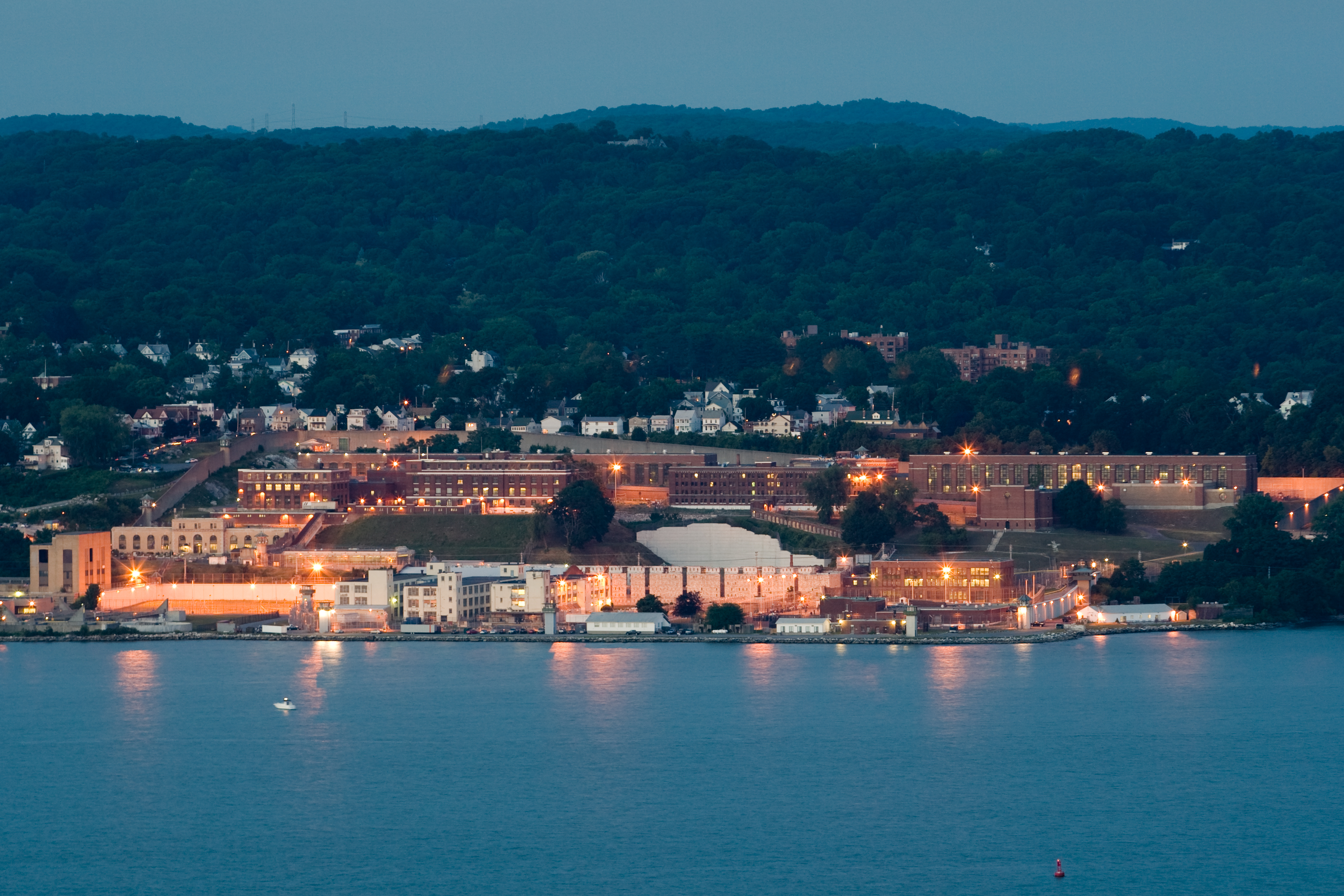
Sing Sing correctional facility was where the execution chamber for New York was located until 1963.

Capital punishment has not been a penalty under state law in the State of New York since 2004 after the New York Court of Appeals declared that the statute as written was not valid under the state's constitution. However, certain federal crimes are subject to the federal death penalty, even if the crimes occur in New York.

In 1972, the U.S. Supreme Court's ruling in Furman v. Georgia declared existing capital punishment statutes unconstitutional, abolishing the practice of capital punishment in the United States. In 1976, the same court's ruling in Gregg v. Georgia allowed states to reinstate the death penalty. In 1995, Governor George Pataki signed a new statute into law which returned the death penalty in New York by authorizing lethal injection for execution.

Prior to Furman v. Georgia, New York was the first state to adopt the electric chair as a method of execution, which replaced hanging. The last New York execution during that time had occurred in 1963, when Eddie Lee Mays was electrocuted at Sing Sing prison. There were no executions in New York after the reinstatement of the death penalty before it was abolished again on June 24, 2004, when the state's highest court ruled in People v. LaValle that the state's death penalty statute violated the state constitution's due process clause because it misled jurors in case of a deadlock. New York has had no valid statute relating to capital punishment since then.

Subsequent legislative attempts at fixing or replacing the statute have failed, and in July 2008 Governor David Paterson issued an executive order closing New York's execution chamber.

== Colonial period and statehood ==
During various periods from the 1600s onward, New York law prescribed the death penalty for crimes such as sodomy, adultery, counterfeiting, perjury, and attempted rape or murder by slaves. In 1796, New York abolished the death penalty for crimes other than murder and treason, but arson was made a capital crime in 1808.

== Temporary abolition ==
In 1860, the New York Legislature passed a bill which effectively, though unintentionally, abolished capital punishment in the state, by repealing hanging as a method of execution without prescribing an alternative method. The bill was signed by Governor Edwin D. Morgan in April 1860. The New York Court of Appeals ruled the statute unconstitutional, in part, as an ex post facto law. Governor Morgan signed legislation to restore capital punishment in 1861, and again in 1862 to fully repeal the earlier statute.

== Introduction of the electric chair ==
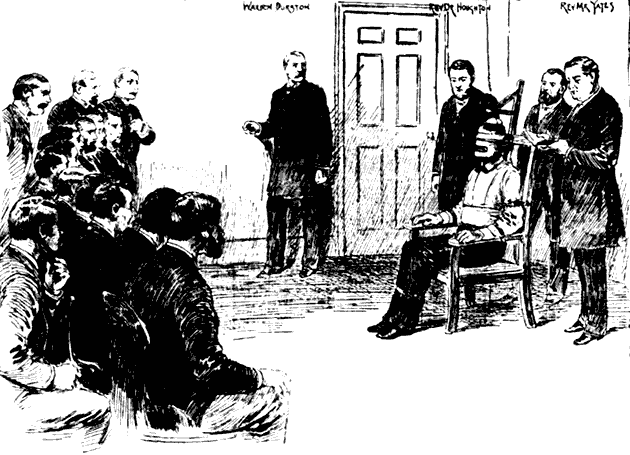
William Kemmler was the first individual to be executed by electric chair, on August 6, 1890.

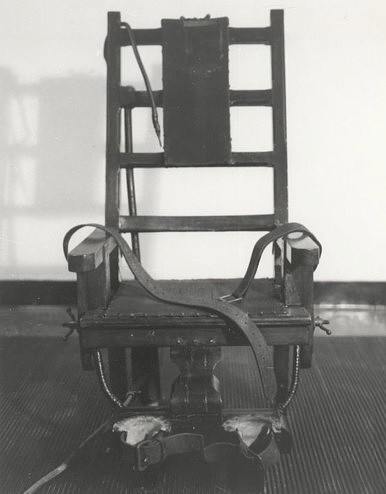
“Old Sparky” at Sing Sing

In 1886, newly elected New York State governor David B. Hill set up a three-member "New York Commission" to determine a new, more humane system of execution to replace hanging. The commission included the human rights advocate and reformer Elbridge Thomas Gerry, New York lawyer and politician Matthew Hale, and Buffalo dentist and experimenter Alfred P. Southwick. Southwick had been developing an idea since the early 1880s of using electric current as a means of capital punishment after hearing about how relatively painlessly and quickly a drunken man died due to grabbing the energized parts on a generator. Southwick had published this proposal first in 1882 and, being a dentist accustomed to performing procedures on subjects in chairs, used the form of a chair in his designs, which became known as the "electric chair". The commission reviewed ancient and modern forms of execution including lethal injection but finally settled on electrocution in 1888. A bill making electrocution New York State's form of execution passed the legislature and was signed by Governor Hill on June 4, 1888, set to go into effect on January 1, 1889.

The first individual to be executed in the electric chair was William Kemmler, on August 6, 1890. Current was passed through Kemmler for 17 seconds and he was declared dead, but witnesses noticed he was still breathing, and the current was turned back on. From start to finish, the execution took eight minutes. During the execution, blood vessels under the skin ruptured and bled, and some witness reported that Kemmler's body caught fire.

== Statistics and evolution ==
From 1890 to 1963, 695 people were executed in New York. The first was William Kemmler on August 6, 1890, and the last was Eddie Lee Mays on August 15, 1963. Kemmler was the first person in the world known to be executed in an electric chair. Except for four individuals, all of the people executed during this period were convicted of murder. The four exceptions were Joseph Sacoda and Demetrius Gula, who were convicted of kidnapping and executed January 11, 1940, and Julius and Ethel Rosenberg, who were convicted of espionage and executed June 19, 1953 in Sing Sing by the federal government, not the state of New York.

In 1937, New York gave the jury the option of recommending mercy in felony first degree murder cases. If the jury recommended mercy, the judge was granted the discretion to sentence the defendant to life in prison. In 1963, New York passed legislation that restricted the use of capital punishment. The statute ended mandatory death sentences for first degree murder, made the jury's sentencing recommendations binding on the court, prohibited death sentences for defendants under 18, and allowed judges to dismiss juries and sentence defendants to life in prison if mitigating circumstances were found.

== Women executed in New York ==
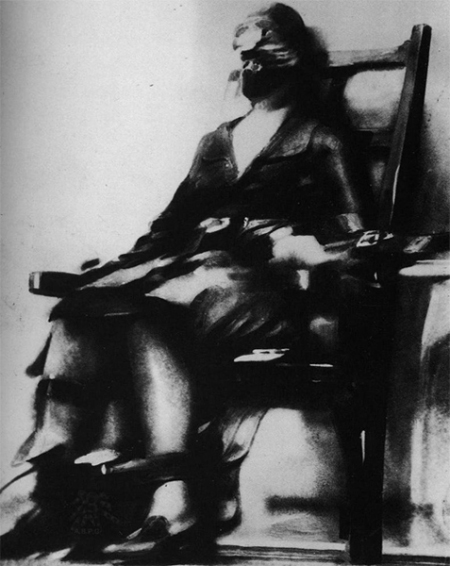
The controversial photo of Ruth Snyder's mid-execution in 1928, taken by Tom Howard and published the next day in the New York Daily News.

Since New York state ratified the United States Constitution in 1788, there have been several women executed by the state, although data from the early period of statehood is less clear. A January 1928 article in the New York Times stated that 7 women had been executed by New York state prior to that date. The article lists Margaret Houghtaling as the first woman to be executed by the state, having been hanged in 1817 for killing her child, but states that she was in fact innocent and another woman had confessed to the crime years later on her deathbed.

However, other sources state that the first woman executed by the state was Mary "Antone" Antoine, who was executed in 1814 for killing a woman whom she considered to be a romantic rival.

In 1825 Peggy Facto was executed for killing her infant child.

The New York Times article lists three women who were executed in the mid-19th century, namely Alice Runkle in 1846, Elizabeth Van Valkenburg in 1849, and Anna Hoag in 1852, all for poisoning their husbands.

The last woman hanged by the state was Roxana Druse in 1887 for killing her husband. The next execution of a woman occurred in 1899 when Martha M. Place become the first woman to die in the electric chair, having been convicted of killing her teenage stepdaughter.

In the 20th century, 7 women were executed by the state of New York: Mary Farmer, in 1909, for killing a woman neighbor, Ruth Snyder in 1928 for killing her husband, Anna Antonio in 1934 for killing her husband, Eva Coo in 1935 for killing her employee, Mary Frances Creighton in 1936 for killing the wife of her accomplice, Helen Fowler in 1944, with Fowler being the first and only Black woman to be executed in New York state (her victim was a white man) and Martha Beck in 1951 for killing an elderly widow. In 1953, the federal execution of Ethel Rosenberg took place in New York state at Sing Sing Prison.

== Notable instances ==
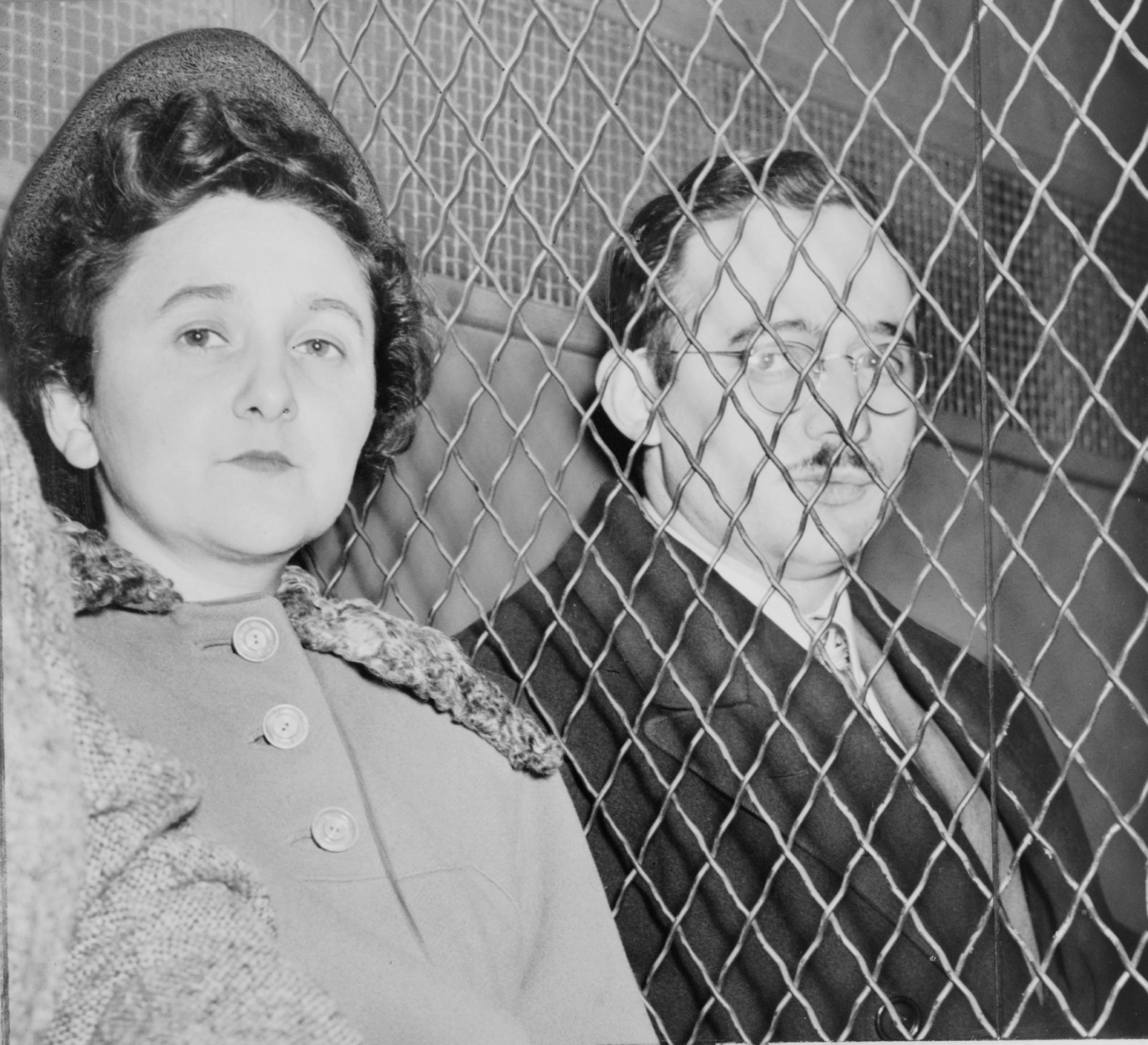
Julius and Ethel Rosenberg

In 1872 and 1873, Erie County Sheriff Grover Cleveland carried out himself two executions by hanging to avoid paying someone else as executioner. Grover Cleveland was later elected President of the United States, serving two non-consecutive terms from 1885 to 1889 and from 1893 to 1897.

In 1901, Leon Czolgosz was electrocuted under state law for the assassination of U.S. President William McKinley. Only after John Kennedy's death in 1963 was it made a federal crime to murder the President of the United States.

Ruth Snyder was one of the very few women executed at Sing Sing. She was put to death in the electric chair in 1928 for the murder of her husband. One of the previously selected execution witnesses, Chicago Tribune photographer Tom Howard, smuggled a small camera into the execution chamber and managed to take a photo of Snyder after the executioner pulled the switch; it was the first known photograph of an electric chair execution, and it remains one of the few known photographs of such.

In January 1936, serial killer Albert Fish was put to death for the cannibal murder of 10-year-old Grace Budd. He was confirmed to have committed at least three murders, but he is suspected of being involved in nine and, prior to his execution, he claimed to have murdered over 100 people. At age 65, Fish was one of the oldest people ever executed at Sing Sing, tied with Michael Rossi, a 65-year-old man who was executed in Sing Sing's electric chair on June 29, 1922. The oldest person to be executed in any New York electric chair was Charles Bonier, who was 75 when he died in Auburn's electric chair on July 31, 1907.

Seven members of Mafia hit squad Murder, Inc. were executed between 1941 and 1944. They included Louis "Lepke" Buchalter, the only mob boss to ever receive the death penalty after being convicted of murder, and his associates Emanuel "Mendy" Weiss and Louis Capone, who were executed on March 4, 1944, the same night as Buchalter.

The "Lonely Hearts Killers" Raymond Fernandez and Martha Beck were convicted of three murders but are believed to have killed as many as 20 women between 1947 and 1949. They were executed together on March 8, 1951.

In June 1953, Julius and Ethel Rosenberg were put to death at Sing Sing after their conviction on federal espionage charges for passing secrets of the atomic bomb to the Soviet Union. The Rosenbergs were the only American civilians to be executed for espionage-related activity during the Cold War. Ethel's conviction and severely botched execution remains controversial as David Greenglass, Ethel's brother and a key witness for the prosecution, later said that he gave a perjured testimony against Ethel to shield his wife from criminal liability. In 2015, eleven members of the New York City Council declared that "the government wrongfully executed Ethel Rosenberg," and Manhattan Borough President Gale Brewer officially recognized "the injustice suffered by Ethel Rosenberg and her family" and designated September 28 as the "Ethel Rosenberg Day of Justice in the Borough of Manhattan."

== 1965 quasi-abolition ==
In 1965, Governor Nelson Rockefeller, a liberal Republican who had previously supported capital punishment and overseen the last executions in the state, signed legislation which abolished the death penalty except for cases involving the murder of a peace officer or when the offender is a life convict. In 1971, it was extended to murder of a correctional employee, and the electric chair was moved from Sing Sing to Green Haven Correctional Facility.

In the July 1972 ruling in Furman v. Georgia, the U.S. Supreme Court struck down the existing death penalty procedures across the United States. This moratorium lasted until 1976, when the Court, in Gregg v. Georgia, upheld the constitutionality of the death penalty, provided it was carried out under new guidelines.

Following Gregg v. Georgia, New York was one of the few states that did not immediately return the death penalty following the ruling. There was legislation to return the death penalty as a sanction that passed the Assembly and Senate, but was vetoed by Democratic Governors Hugh Carey and Mario Cuomo.

A mandatory death sentence for murder committed by a life convict was still provided by the law of the time, under which serial killer Lemuel Smith was sentenced to death in 1983 for murdering a female prison officer. This statute was nullified in 1984. The electric chair was nevertheless maintained in workable conditions.

In 1989, Donald Trump designed an ad calling to bring back the death penalty in New York during the Central Park jogger case, four black men and one Hispanic male accused of the rape and attempted murder of a white female jogger in Central Park. They were exonerated in 2002.

== 1995 reinstatement ==
In 1994, Republican George Pataki was elected governor after promising during his campaign to reinstate the death penalty.

On January 11, 1995, eleven days after Pataki took office, convicted killer Thomas J. Grasso, who had been sentenced to death by Oklahoma but was serving a sentence of 20 years to life in New York, was extradited from New York to Oklahoma to face execution. Grasso was transported to Buffalo Niagara International Airport and flown to Oklahoma. He was executed via lethal injection on March 20, 1995. The extradition was previously blocked by Pataki's predecessor Mario Cuomo who opposed capital punishment.

Capital punishment was reinstated in New York in 1995 for a wide range of aggravating factors, when Pataki signed a new statute into law, which provided for execution by lethal injection.

== Statute ruled unconstitutional ==
On June 24, 2004, the New York Court of Appeals, the state's highest court, held 4–3 in People v. LaValle that the state's death penalty statute violated the New York Constitution, because in case of a deadlocked jury the judge could impose a sentence lesser than life without parole, so jurors would be "coerced" to vote for death solely to prevent the convict from being paroled. Governor Pataki criticized the ruling and called for a quick legislative fix.

Between December 2004 and February 2005, public hearings were held in Manhattan and Albany. New York Law School professor and death penalty advocate Robert Blecker advocated strongly in favor of reinstatement, while Manhattan local prosecutor Robert M. Morgenthau strongly opposed reinstatement, an issue which had political significance during the subsequent district attorney elections.

In 2005, supporters of the death penalty in the New York Legislature passed a bill restoring New York's death penalty in the Republican-controlled State Senate, but the legislation was voted down by a legislative committee in the Democratic-controlled New York Assembly, and was not enacted into law.

In 2007, the New York Court of Appeals decided in People v. Taylor that the statute defect could not be corrected by a judge instruction to the jury that he would impose life without parole. This led to the commutation of the last of the seven death sentences that were imposed under the 1995 statute.

In 2008, the State Senate again passed legislation that would have established the death penalty for the murder of law enforcement officers, but the Assembly did not act on the legislation. In July of that year, Governor David Paterson ordered the removal of all execution equipment used to perform lethal injection and the closure of the execution chamber at the Green Haven Correctional Facility.

The 1995 statute has never been repealed and is still on the books.

== Death sentences under 1995 statute ==
From the 1995 reinstatement of capital punishment in the state to its abolishment in 2007, only seven death sentences were handed down. The state's only modern-age death row inmates were:

- Darrel K. Harris — sentenced in Brooklyn in 1998. Harris, a former NYS corrections officer, was convicted of killing three people during the 1996 robbery of an illegal social club.
- Angel Mateo — sentenced in Monroe County in 1998. Convicted of kidnapping and murdering a man in Rochester during a 1996 crime spree. Mateo was also implicated in three other murders from 1995.
- Robert Y. Shulman — sentenced in Suffolk County in 1999. Convicted of murdering three women in Suffolk County and two women in Westchester County between 1991 and 1995.
- James F. Cahill — sentenced in Onondaga County in 1999. Convicted of fatally poisoning his wife in a hospital after non-fatally beating her with a baseball bat in their Syracuse home in 1998.
- Stephen LaValle — sentenced in Suffolk County in 1999. Convicted of assaulting and fatally stabbing a female jogger in 1997.
- Nicholson McCoy — sentenced in Suffolk County in 2000. Convicted of assaulting and fatally stabbing a coworker in the bathroom of a supermarket they both worked at in 1998.
- John Taylor — sentenced in Queens in 2002. Taylor, with another man, committed the Wendy's massacre, in which they murdered five employees during a 2000 robbery. Taylor was the last person on the state's death row until capital punishment was abolished in 2007.

== Federal cases ==
There is currently no inmate on federal death row sentenced for a crime committed in the state of New York.

In 2007, Ronell Wilson was sentenced to death for the murder of two undercover New York City police officers in Staten Island, but the sentence was later reversed as result of a ruling from the Second Circuit appeal court.

In 2023, federal prosecutors sought the death penalty against Sayfullo Saipov for the 2017 New York City truck attack which killed eight people. Saipov was ultimately sentenced to life after the jury deadlocked on sentencing.

The federal death penalty is currently pursued in the following cases:

- The 9/11 attacks, whom defendants are incarcerated at Guantanamo Bay and were indicted before a military commission sitting there. Congressional opposition led the Obama administration to drop its original plan to have them tried by a Manhattan civilian jury, as Zacharias Moussaoui was in 2006. A 2024 plea agreement in exchange of a life sentence is currently challenged in court by the Defense Department.
- 21-year-old Payton Gendron for the 2022 Buffalo shooting which murdered 10 people. The trial is scheduled to begin in late 2026.

== See also ==
- Capital punishment in the United States
- Crime in New York (state)
- Law of New York (state)
- List of people executed in New York
- New York State Electrician (executioner)
