= Electrocution =

Death or injury by passage of electricity

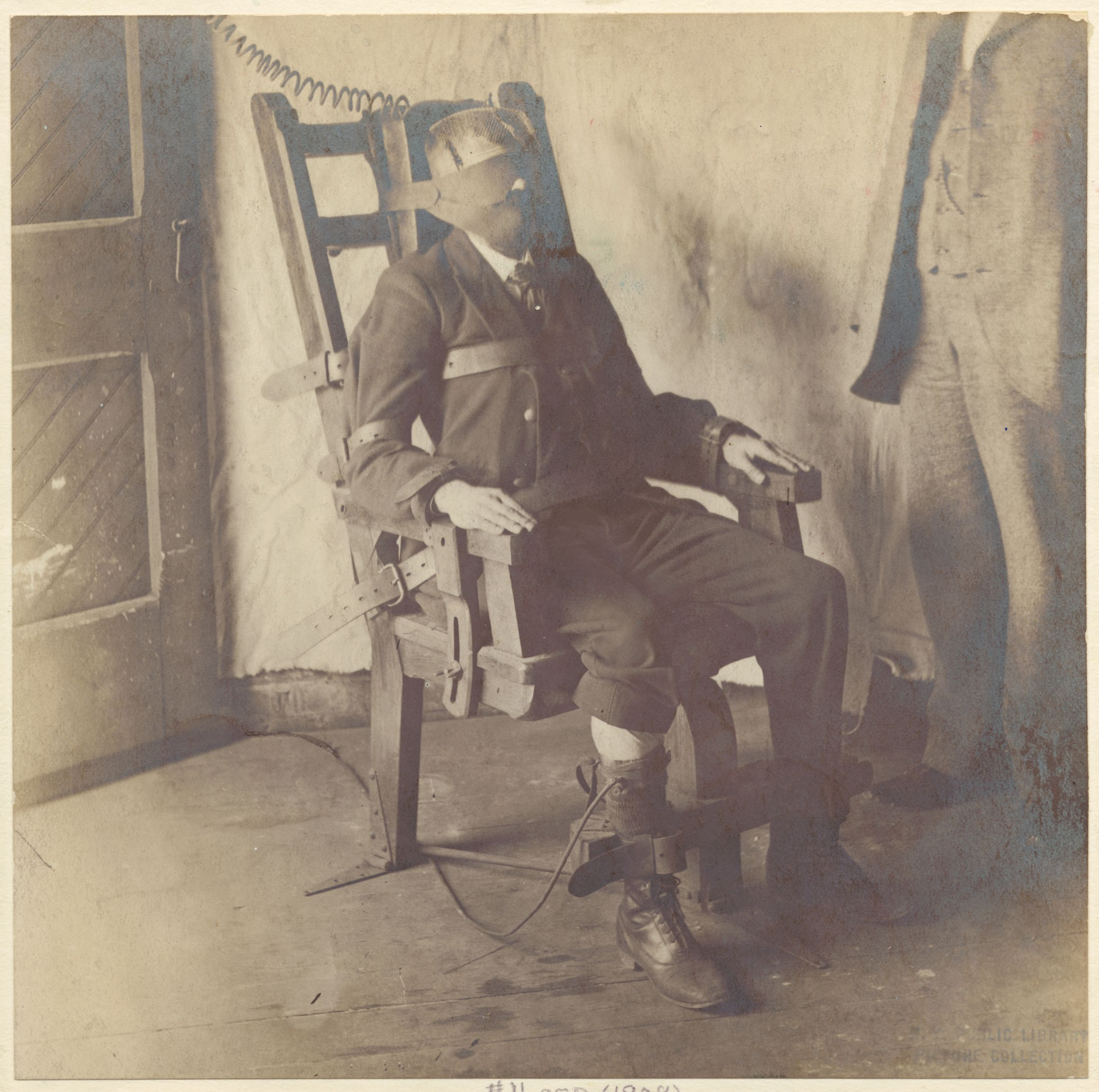
Death by electric chair, which was a common execution method in the early 20th century

Electrocution is death or severe injury (Note: Some sources restrict the usage to fatal instances.) caused by electric shock from electric current passing through the body. The word is derived from "electro" and "execution", but it is also used for accidental death.

The term "electrocution" was coined in 1889 in the US just before the first use of the electric chair and originally referred to only electrical execution and not other electrical deaths. However, since no English word was available for non-judicial deaths due to electric shock, the word "electrocution" eventually took over as a description of all circumstances of electrical death from the new commercial electricity.

== Origins ==
In the Netherlands, in 1746, Pieter van Musschenbroek's lab assistant, Andreas Cuneus, received an extreme shock while working with a leyden jar, the first recorded injury from human-made electricity. By the mid-19th century high-voltage electrical systems came into use to power arc lighting for theatrical stage lighting and lighthouses leading to the first recorded accidental death in 1879 when a stage carpenter in Lyon, France, touched a 250-volt wire.

The spread of arc light–based street lighting systems (which at the time ran at a voltage above 3,000 volts) after 1880 led to many people dying from coming in contact with these high-voltage lines, a strange new phenomenon which seemed to kill instantaneously without leaving a mark on the victim. This would lead to execution by electricity in the electric chair in the early 1890s as an official method of capital punishment in the U.S. state of New York, thought to be a more humane alternative to hanging. After an 1881 death in Buffalo, New York, caused by a high-voltage arc lighting system, Alfred P. Southwick sought to develop this phenomenon into a way to execute condemned criminals. Southwick, a dentist, based his device on the dental chair.

The next nine years saw a promotion by Southwick, the New York state Gerry commission (which included Southwick) recommending execution by electricity, a June 4, 1888 law making it the state form of execution on January 2, 1889, and a further state committee of doctors and lawyers to finalize the details of the method used.

The adoption of the electric chair became mixed up in the "war of currents" between Thomas Edison's direct current system and industrialist George Westinghouse's alternating current system in 1889 when noted anti-AC activist Harold P. Brown became a consultant to the committee. Brown pushed, with the assistance and sometimes collusion of Edison Electric and Westinghouse's chief AC rival, the Thomson-Houston Electric Company, for the successful adoption of alternating current to power the chair, an attempt to portray AC as a public menace and the "executioners' current".

=== Etymology ===
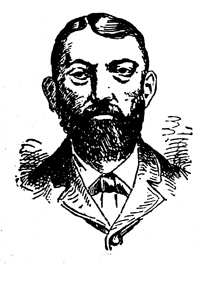
William Kemmler

In May 1889, the state of New York sentenced its first criminal, a street merchant and convicted murderer named William Kemmler, to be executed in their new form of capital punishment. Tabloid newspapers, trying to describe this new form of electrical execution, started settling on "electrocution," a portmanteau word derived from "electro" and "execution".

It was not the only choice of word people were considering. The New York Times editorial column noted words such as "Westinghoused" (after the Westinghouse Electric alternating current equipment that was to be used), "Gerrycide" (after Elbridge Thomas Gerry, who headed the New York death penalty commission that suggested adopting the electric chair), and "Browned" (after anti-AC activist Harold P. Brown). Thomas Edison preferred the words dynamort, ampermort and electromort. The New York Times hated the word electrocution, describing it as being pushed forward by "pretentious ignoramuses".

== Medical aspects ==
Electrocutions are relatively rare, causing about 1000 fatalities in the United States each year, around 400 of these deaths occur from high-voltage electric sources. Between 50 and 300 cases occur from lightning. Fish & Geddes state: "Contact with 20 mA of low-frequency electrical current through the chest can be fatal". The threshold electrical current RMS magnitude required to trigger cardiac arrest is well studied. The mechanism of cardiac arrest is typically ventricular fibrillation as opposed to ventricular asystole. Ventricular fibrillation prevents effective pumping of blood through the vascular system resulting in death, if not quickly reverted to a more effective cardiac rhythm.

An electric shock requires a voltage source and at least two contact points to the person's body. The health hazard of an electric current flowing through the body depends on the amount of current and the length of time for which it flows, not merely on the voltage. However, a high voltage is required to produce a high current through the body. This is due to the relatively high resistance of skin when dry, requiring a high voltage to pass through. The severity of a shock also depends on whether the path of the current includes a vital organ.

Death can occur from any shock that carries enough sustained current through a vital organ or tissue. When an electric current flows through the brain or spinal cord, death due to asphyxiation may occur as a result of interference with the central nervous system's control of respiration, or through direct paralysis of the chest muscles. Low currents (70–700 mA) usually trigger fibrillation in the heart, which is reversible via defibrillator but is nearly always fatal without intervention. Currents as low as 30 mA AC or 300–500 mA DC applied to the body surface can cause fibrillation. Large currents (> 1 A) cause permanent damage via burns and cellular damage.

== Suicide ==
Electrocution is an uncommon form of suicide.

In Nazi concentration camps, prisoners commonly committed suicide by throwing themselves at the electric fences, colloquially known as "going to the wire."
