= Current wars =

Current wars can refer to:

- Wars presently being waged, see List of ongoing armed conflicts
- War of the currents, a late 19th century commercial battle over the choice of AC or DC for electricity supply
- The Current War, a 2017 historical drama film about the war of the currents
