= Deaths on Pleasant Street =

Book

Deaths on Pleasant Street: The Ghastly Enigma of Colonel Swope and Doctor Hyde (ISBN 978-1931112918) is a non-fiction book describing the suspicious deaths of three members of the prominent Swope family of Independence Mo. The deaths took place in the fall and winter of 1909, in the family's 26-room gothic mansion. Author Giles Fowler presents evidence that at least two of the deaths were murders, committed by Dr. Bennett Clark Hyde, who was married to a Swope heiress. The first Hyde trial, for the murder of philanthropist Thomas Hunton Swope, was covered by virtually every major newspaper in the United States. Fowler's book, published by the Truman State University Press, was winner of the Jackson County, MO. Historical Society's Historic Book of the Year award, in 2009, and a 2009 ForeWord award as True Crime Book of the Year.
