= Thomas H. Swope =

American real estate magnate (1827–1909)

Thomas Hunton Swope
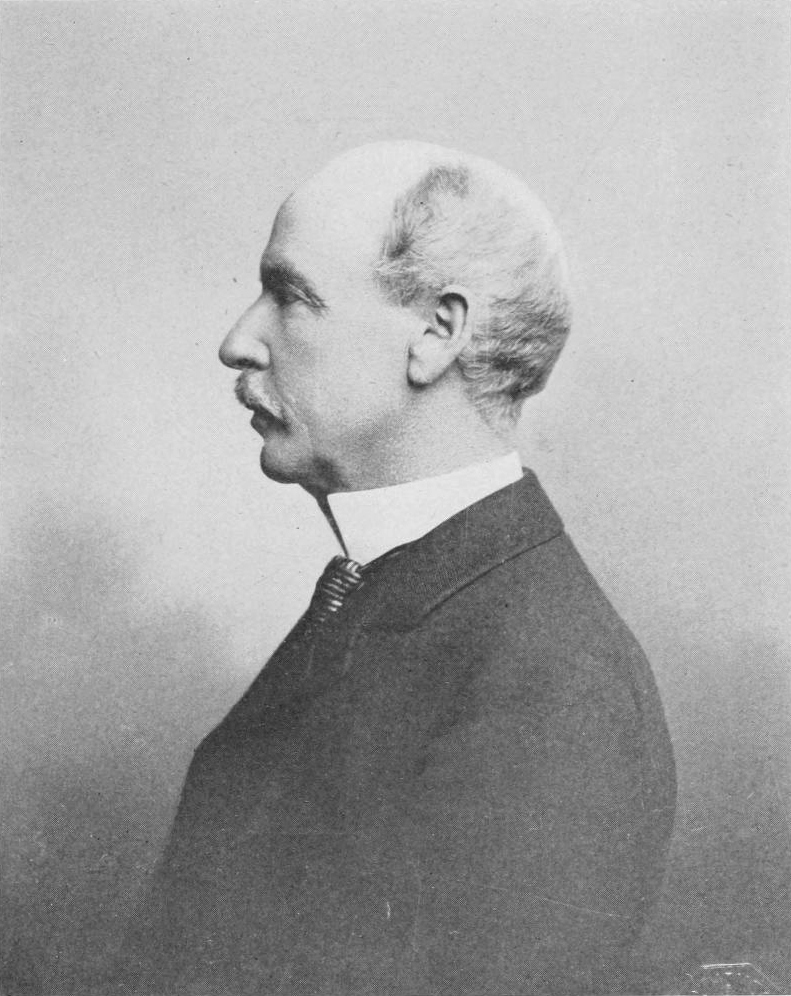
- Born: October 21, 1827; Lincoln County, Kentucky, U.S.
- Died: October 3, 1909 (aged 81); Kansas City, Missouri, U.S.
- Cause of death: Homicide
- Resting place: Swope Park; Kansas City, Missouri, U.S.
- Education: Centre College; Yale Law School
- Occupations: Real estate magnate; philanthropist

Thomas Hunton Swope (October 21, 1827 – October 3, 1909) was an American real estate magnate and philanthropist in Kansas City, Missouri. His death in 1909 became the focus of one of the most publicized murder trials in the early 20th century.

== Biography ==
=== Early life ===
Thomas Hunton Swope was born on October 21, 1827, in Lincoln County, Kentucky. In his youth, Swope was an avid reader known as "bookish and delicate". After graduating from Centre College in Danville, Kentucky in 1848, he attended Yale Law School but never practiced the profession. Instead of practicing law, he became interested in real estate and mining in New York and St. Louis.

=== Career ===
Swope was a Yale graduate with money to invest. After living in several states, he eventually made his way to Missouri when he moved to St. Louis and began working in real estate. He came west in 1855 as the Kansas Territory opened and settled in Kansas City in 1857. Swope began purchasing property here and would later go on to become the largest individual land owner in Kansas City. Mr. Swope was called "Colonel" Swope, but the title was honorary and not from military service.

=== Swope Park ===
In 1893, civic reformers put forth an effort to beautify the city with parks and boulevards. Swope actively opposed the plan because he would be heavily taxed for owning vacant real estate lots. The Kansas City Star responded to his opposition by calling him a greedy mossback who "evaded taxes, fighting progress, and getting rich."

In 1896, the seventy-year-old Swope donated 1,334 acres (5.40 km^{2}) of land to be used as a public park. The land lay seven miles (11 km) southeast of town and was used to create Swope Park. 18,000 Kansas Citians celebrated opening day for Swope Park with the "Colonel" wandering around the crowd while they listened to a two-hour speech honoring his benefactions.

=== Death ===
Swope's sudden illness and demise happened under mysterious circumstances, as did several others in the family. Swope was known to be mild-mannered and self-conscious, and was a lifelong bachelor. He lived alone until later in life when he moved into the turreted red brick mansion of his late brother Logan Swope, home of his sister-in-law Margaret "Maggie" Chrisman Swope as well as seven nieces and nephews. The frugal millionaire commuted daily by streetcar to his downtown Kansas City office in the New England Life Building until the month before his death.

Swope's last days were preoccupied with how best to bestow his wealth. His real estate alone was worth three and a half million dollars. In his last days Swope was sometimes treated by Doctor Bennett Clark Hyde, who had married one of his nieces (Logan and Margaret Swope's daughter, Frances). On October 3, 1909, just 18 days short of his 82nd birthday, Col. Swope died suddenly in his sister-in-law's home with Dr. Hyde in attendance, the aftermath of a perplexing, brief and violent illness. Swope's body lay in state at the Kansas City Public Library where thousands of mourners paid their respects. Until a tomb could be prepared in Swope Park where he had requested burial, he lay in a holding vault.

Three months after Swope's death, Dr. Hyde came under suspicion and was charged with murder by strychnine poisoning in "a plot for money." The body of Thomas Hunton Swope was exhumed by coroner Ludvig Hektoen and an autopsy performed. At his request, Walter Stanley Haines conducted a postmortem examination of the internal organs and reported that Thomas Hunton Swope's body contained lethal amounts of both strychnine and cyanide.

Hyde was charged, tried and convicted on May 16, 1910, of the murder of Thomas Swope. On appeal, the verdict was overturned on procedural grounds. Three more trials, seven years and a quarter of a million dollars later, the charges against Hyde were dropped and he was released.

Eight and a half years after his death, Col. Thomas Swope was laid to rest in Swope Park. On April 8, 1918, he was buried high on a hill amid a forest of trees, overlooking his gift to Kansas City. His remains lie beneath a Greek temple of white granite, guarded by a pair of stone lions.

== See also ==
- Walter Stanley Haines
- William Rockhill Nelson
- Jesse Clyde Nichols
- William Volker
- Deaths on Pleasant Street, book covering Swope's death
