= Frederick Peterson =

American poet

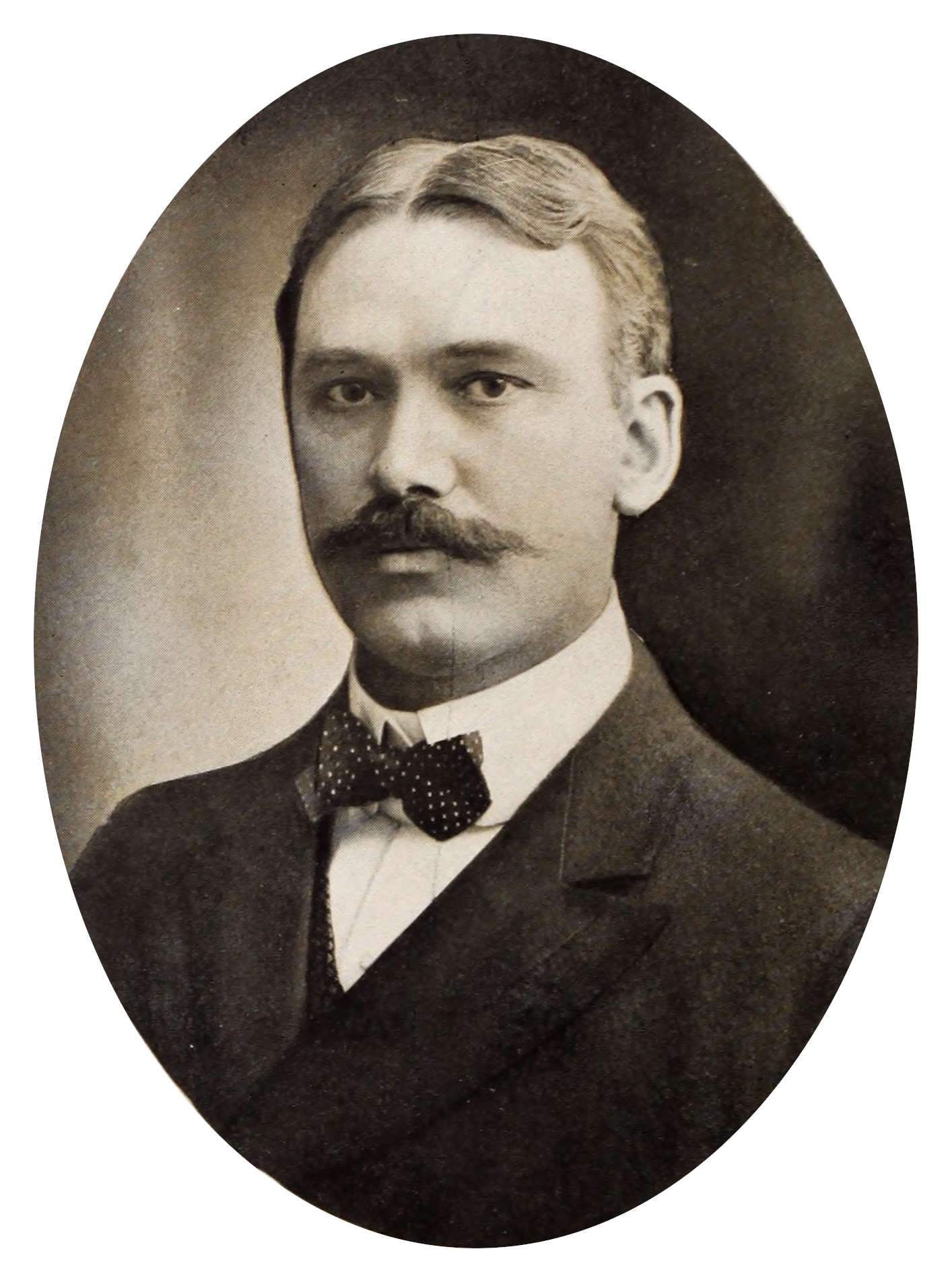
Frederick Peterson

Frederick Peterson (March 1, 1859 – July 9, 1938) was an American neurologist and poet. He was the president of the New York Neurological Society from 1899 to 1901 and the American Neurological Association in 1925.

== Early life and education ==
Peterson was born in Faribault, Minnesota. After graduating from the University at Buffalo, he attended the Universities of Vienna, Zurich, Strassburg and Gőttingen.

== Career ==
Upon his return to the United States, he became a professor at the University at Buffalo in 1882. For the following decade he practiced as a neurologist in New York City. He spent 1893–1894 as a professor at the University of Vermont. From 1892 to 1902 he was president of the Craig Colony for Epileptics, the first residential facility for people with epilepsy in the United States. In 1900 he was appointed the president of the New York State Commission on Lunacy. In the late 1800s he was Clinical Professor of Mental Diseases at the Woman's Medical College of the New York Infirmary, the institution founded by early female physicians Elizabeth Blackwell and Emily Blackwell. From 1900 until his retirement in 1915, he was on faculty as a full professor of "nervous and mental diseases" at Columbia University.

He was involved in Harold P. Brown's 1888 anti-alternating current dog electrocution demonstrations at Columbia University during the war of the currents. Later that year, he was appointed by the New York Medico-Legal Society to lead up a committee finalizing the method of electrical execution via the electric chair in that state.

Peterson's major contributions to neurology include editorial positions at:

- The Journal of Nervous and Medical Diseases
- The New York Medical Journal

and contributions to textbooks including

- Nervous and Mental Diseases with Archibald Church, 1899
- A Textbook of Legal Medicine and Toxicology (1903–04) with Walter Stanley Haines Philadelphia and London, W. B. Saunders & company; second edition published as Legal medicine and toxicology by many specialists, edited by Frederick Peterson, Walter S. Haines, and Ralph W. Webster. Philadelphia : W.B. Saunders, 1923.

=== Art ===
In addition to his numerous medical writings, Peterson was an accomplished poet. He published Poems and Swedish Translations in 1883, In the Shade of the Ygdrasil in 1893, and the play The Flutter of the Gold Leaf (1922) which he co-wrote with Olive Tilford Dargan.

One of his poems, "The Sweetest Flower that Blows," was set by James Hotchkiss Rogers to music and became the popular song "At Parting."

According to his obituary, he was a connoisseur and collector of Chinese paintings.

== Personal life ==
Peterson married Antoinette Rotan in 1895. Before marriage, she started a charitable home for "aged women" in her hometown of Waco, Texas, called the Antoinette Rotan Home. She wrote health books for children as "Mrs. Frederick Peterson," titled The Child Health Alphabet, Everychild's Book, and Rhymes of Cho Cho's Grandma.

They had two daughters, Fredericka and Virgilia. Virgilia Peterson was a noted author, critic and host of the DuMont Network program The Author Meets The Critics.
