= Walter Stanley Haines =

American forensic scientist and teacher

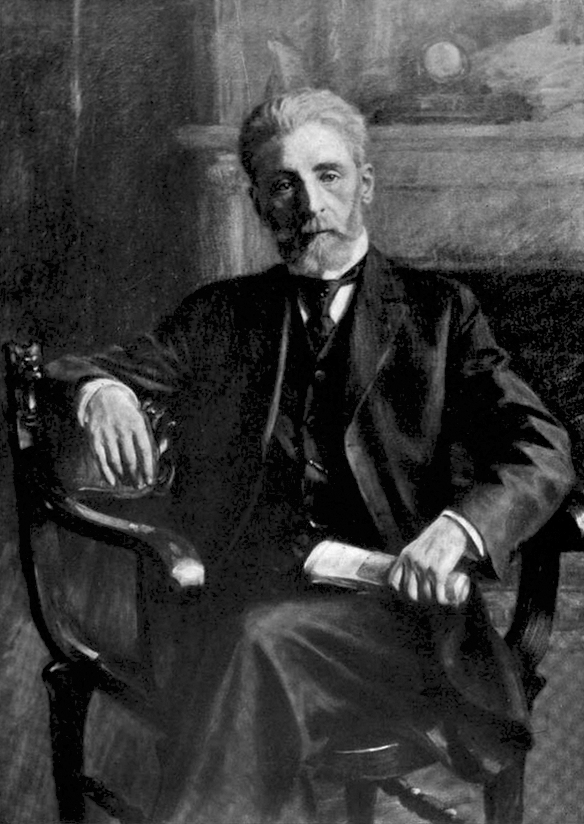
- Born: September 27, 1850; Chicago, Illinois, US
- Died: January 27, 1923 (aged 72); Chicago, Illinois, US
- Education: Massachusetts Institute of Technology, Chicago Medical College
- Scientific career
- Fields: Forensics
- Workplaces: Chicago Medical College, Rush Medical College

Walter Stanley Haines (September 27, 1850 – January 27, 1923) was an American professor of chemistry, materia medica, and toxicology. He taught at Rush Medical College in Chicago for almost 50 years, and was acclaimed for his teaching. With Frederick Peterson, he published a comprehensive guide to medicine and the law, A Textbook on Legal Medicine and Toxicology, which went through many editions.

An early forensic scientist, Haines testified in a number of sensational trials, including those relating to the Haymarket bombing of 1886, the disappearance of Adolph Luetgert's second wife Louisa in 1897, and the suspicious deaths in multimillionaire Thomas Hunton Swope's family in 1909.

== Early life and education ==
Walter Stanley Haines was born September 27, 1850, to John Charles Haines and Emma Adams (Fay) Haines of Chicago. His father was an ardent abolitionist and held the position of mayor of Chicago for two terms (1858–1860). Walter was one of four children. He graduated from Chicago High School in 1869, ranking first in his class.

Walter Haines attended Massachusetts Institute of Technology for two years, 1869–1871, but returned to Chicago as a result of illness. Changing his major from chemistry to medicine, he earned a medical degree from Chicago Medical College in 1873. Before graduating, he was offered the position of professor of chemistry at Chicago Medical College, which he held from 1872 to 1876. He interned at Mercy Hospital in Chicago and also visited France to study at the Sorbonne in Paris.

== Career ==
In 1876, at age 26, Walter Haines was offered a professorship in chemistry at Rush Medical College in Chicago, which he accepted. Haines spent nearly fifty years there, teaching chemistry, materia medica, and toxicology. He was acclaimed for both the quality of his teaching and his kind and sympathetic manner:

It was the usual experience of students from other schools who had labored memorizing endless "equations" that his clear analysis changed chemistry for them from a difficult "blind" subject to a pleasant and profitable one. His kindness and almost feminine gentleness endeared him to fifty classes of students, and as a member of the faculty his influence moderated the asperities during many strenuous years.

With Frederick Peterson, Haines published A Textbook on Legal Medicine and Toxicology, a comprehensive guide to medicine and the law. Haine's contributions included a chapter on "General Principles of Toxicology", which described common poisons, their symptoms and treatment, and best practices for postmortem examinations. The textbook first appeared in two volumes in 1903–1904 and went through multiple editions.

Haines was recognized as an authority in chemistry. He was a member of the American Chemical Society, the American Medical Association, and the Chemical Society of London, among others. He served on the Committee on Revision of the U.S. Pharmacopeia, an official national reference book for pharmaceutical standards and practice, from 1900 to 1920. He also served on the Illinois State Food Standard Commission; and the Illinois Commission on Industrial Diseases.

In 1916, Rush Medical College was presented with a portrait of Haines, painted by Arvid Nyholm. In 1922, the Alumni Association recognized Haines' long teaching career by presenting him with a gold watch and announced that they planned to establish a Walter S. Haines Fund for the library of Rush Medical College.

Haines continued to teach until his death on January 27, 1923, at Presbyterian Hospital, Chicago, Illinois. His death was attributed to bronchiectasis and chronic nephritis.

== Forensics and criminology ==
Haines was a pioneer in adapting medical techniques from the laboratory for application to forensics investigations and the presentation of courtroom evidence. In this capacity he was called upon to testify in both civil and criminal trials, including a number of sensational cases. His cases involved a variety of different experimental techniques for examining evidence and testing possible forensic scenarios.

His unswerving adherence to the facts, revealed by his analyses and tests, the rigid care and thoroughness with which these analyses were conducted and controlled, combined with a remarkable faculty of explaining scientific facts and methods in language intelligible to those wholly unacquainted with chemistry or medicine, made his testimony most convincing to judge and jury and a formidable problem to the cross examiner. No abuse or heckling of the opposing side, however brutal and exasperating, could move him from his attitude of courteous, gentlemanly demeanor. The shrewder members of the bar early discovered the wisdom of refraining from the cross examination of Dr. Haines, for it almost always resulted in giving added force to his testimony. Some of the trials in which his cross examination was conducted by distinguished lawyers, who vied with him in quiet, courteous deportment, will long be remembered for their masterly, delightful word-fencing.

=== Haymarket bombing ===
Haines testified on July 30, 1886 at the trial of the men accused of the Haymarket bombing. He discussed fragments of the exploded bombs, the only physical evidence to be presented at the trial, and their similarity to materials found in the possession of one of the defendants. He and chemist Mark Delafontaine analyzed several samples of bomb fragments, including fragments from the bodies of Officer Mathias Degan, who died in the explosion, and Officer Murphy who survived. Other materials came from intact bombs found in the apartment of defendant Louis Lingg. The prosecution argued that defendant August Spies also had access to explosives.

The question facing Haines and Delafontaine was whether the materials from the exploded bomb were similar in terms of their chemical composition to the materials in the defendant's possession. Anyone who was party to the plan could be held responsible for its consequences under Illinois law if it could be shown that the bombing was premeditated–which was murder in the Haymarket case. Haines testified that the unexploded bombs confiscated by the police were similar in composition to the explosion fragments. The samples mainly contained lead, but also included small amounts of tin and traces of antimony and zinc. One sample also contained trace amounts of copper, though the trace elements were considered insignificant.

The fragments that struck the two officers were similar. They did not perfectly match the samples from the unexploded bombs, but Haines suggested that they were made by similar processes involving melting lead and other metals, then casting it in clay molds to form a bomb casing. Haines argued that commercial lead samples did not include tin and suggested that the exploded and unexploded bombs had been made from a consistent "recipe".

The prosecutors could not prove that any of the eight defendants threw the bomb, but they convicted them nonetheless. Lingg committed suicide in his cell with a blasting cap, smuggled inside a cigar. August Spies, George Engel, Albert Parsons, and Adolph Fischer were hanged. The other defendants had their sentences commuted.

=== Disappearance of Louisa Luetgert ===
Adolph Luetgert, nicknamed "the sausage king of Chicago", was accused in 1897 of the murder of his second wife Louisa Bicknese Luetgert. She had reportedly gone missing as of May 1, 1897. Police suspected Luetgert of killing Louisa at the A.L. Luetgert Sausage & Packing Company, dissolving her body in the plant and burning whatever remained in a furnace. Police searched the factory, finding bone fragments and a couple of rings, one marked "L.L."

Haines testified that the remains found by the police were physically consistent with the suspected method of disposing of Louisa's body. Haines reported that he had tested this by boiling down three cadavers in solutions of potash, a substance that Luetgert had purchased prior to Louisa's disappearance. The resultant remains were similar to those found in the sausage factory. The court determined that Louisa Luetgert was dead and convicted Adolph Luetgert of her murder.

=== Deaths in the Thomas Hunton Swope family ===
In late 1909, several deaths occurred in the home of Thomas Hunton Swope, a Kansas City bachelor who had become a multimillionaire in real estate. He lived with his widowed sister-in-law Margaret Swope in her 26-room mansion, as did a number of her children and other extended family members. Margaret's daughter Frances and her husband Dr. Bennett Clark Hyde also lived nearby, though not in the same house. Frances had married Dr. Hyde on June 21, 1905 in spite of strong opposition from her mother. By 1909, however, mother and daughter had reconciled, and Thomas Hunton Swope had given the couple a home of their own.

The first person in the Swope household to die was James Moss Hunton, a cousin of Margaret Swope's late husband Logan; he had lived with the family before and after Logan's death. He was a banker, and he managed Logan's estate and was the executor for Thomas Hunton Swope's will. He and Swope had recently been discussing the possibility of changes to the will; Swope was considering giving more of his huge fortune to charity, which would leave less of it to divide among his surviving family.

On October 1, 1909, Hunton was taken suddenly and violently ill. He was apparently suffering from a cerebral hemorrhage, and a standard practice of the time was blood-letting to remove pressure on the brain. Bennett Clark Hyde carried out the blood-letting and insisted on bleeding him heavily, in spite of objections from nurse Pearl Kellar and Dr. George Twyman. Hunton died.

Thomas Hunton Swope died on October 3 after a short illness and before any changes could be made to his will. Hyde was involved again, and his medical treatment was considered questionable. He gave Swope's nurse an unidentified capsule "to improve his digestion", and Swope went into convulsions some 20 minutes later. His legs were stiff, his jaw was clenched, and his heart was racing. Hyde's treatment was to give Swope repeated injections of strychnine, which was sometimes used when the heart needed stimulation. Swope died within a few hours.

On Thanksgiving, November 25, 1909, the remaining members of the Swope and Hyde families ate Thanksgiving dinner at the Swope home. Within a week, nine of the Swopes were stricken with typhoid fever. The Hydes did not become ill, possibly because they had brought bottled water to drink that Thanksgiving. Frances' brother William Chrisman Swope seemed to be improving until Hyde gave him a capsule. He began convulsing, was given strychnine by Hyde, and died on December 6, 1909. Hyde diagnosed the fatal illness as meningitis. Frances and William's sister Margaret also took a pill at Hyde's instruction and went into convulsions, but she recovered with treatment from Dr. George Twyman.

James Moss Hunton, Thomas Hunton Swope, and William Chrisman Swope had all died after questionable treatment by Bennett Clark Hyde. Suspicions mounted, and investigators linked Hyde to the purchase of cyanide capsules and typhoid cultures. Coroner Ludvig Hektoen ordered Walter Haines to perform autopsies on William Chrisman Swope (December 30, 1909) and Thomas Hunton Swope (January 12, 1910). Haines reported that Thomas Hunton Swope's body contained lethal amounts of strychnine and cyanide. Hyde was tried and convicted of the murder of Thomas Swope on May 16, 1910.

Hyde appealed the decision, and the Missouri Supreme Court overturned the verdict on procedural grounds on April 11, 1911 and called for a retrial. Hyde's wife Frances supported him through extensive court proceedings, which included at least two mistrials, one possible bribery attempt, and additional litigation over who would pay the cost of the prosecution. The State of Missouri and Margaret Swope are estimated to have spent $250,000 pursuing Hyde's conviction, but the charges were dropped on April 9, 1917 and he was released. In 1920, Frances divorced Hyde on charges that he was threatening and abusive, but she continued to maintain that he was innocent of murder.
