= Harold P. Brown =

American inventor (1869–1932)

Harold Pitney Brown
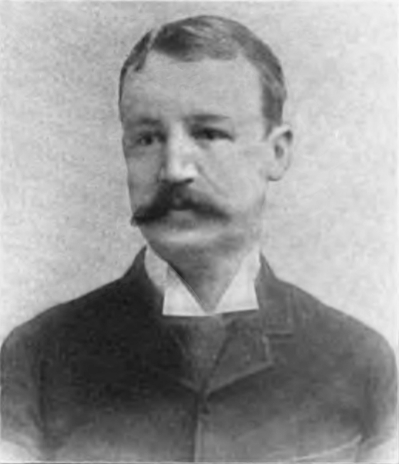
- Born: September 16, 1857; Janesville, Wisconsin
- Died: 1944 (aged 86–87); Volusia, Florida
- Education: self-educated
- Engineering career
- Discipline: Electrical engineer
- Employers: The Western Electric Manufacturing Company of Chicago, Brush Electric Company, Private consultant
- Awards: Edward Longstreth Medal

Harold Pitney Brown (September 16, 1857, Janesville, Wisconsin – 1944, Volusia, Florida) was an American electrical engineer and inventor known for his activism in the late 1880s against the use of alternating current (AC) for electric lighting in New York City and around the country (during the "war of the currents").

Brown was mostly self-educated, working for several companies in the fledgling electrical field before striking out on his own, working on his own inventions as well as hiring himself out as a consultant.

After several deaths were caused by the high voltages used in alternating current arc lighting systems in New York City, Brown came to prominence in June 1888, claiming in the press and then in public meetings that AC was more deadly than direct current (DC) and that the arc lighting companies were cutting corners and using AC to save money at the cost of public safety. He conducted public demonstrations (electrocuting animals with AC) then lobbied around the country trying to limit AC transmission line voltages to 300 volts, tactics which had him using the press to directly attack the country's largest AC equipment manufacturer, Westinghouse Electric. He also pushed to have the first electric chair, which was being developed by the state of New York, be powered with AC current, provided by Westinghouse generators he had surreptitiously acquired. His involvement in these events is controversial since he was working parallel with (some documents show colluded with) the Edison Illuminating Company, showing a preference for Edison's direct current power system and advocating for severe restrictions on AC power systems that would put Edison's competitors at a disadvantage.

== Biography ==
Harold Brown was born in Janesville, Wisconsin, on September 16, 1857, the son of General Theodore F. Brown and Frances Brown. His father was in the American Civil War and received an honorary rank of brigadier general for his role in the Battle of Kennesaw Mountain.

Brown graduated Chicago High School in 1876 and prepared to enroll in mining engineering courses at Harvard but was unable to since the Great Chicago Fire of 1871 had left his family in reduced circumstances. After high school he was employed at the Western Electric Manufacturing Company of Chicago working on development and manufacturing of electrical devices, including Edison's electric pen duplicating machine, from 1876 to 1879. From 1879 to 1884 he worked for Brush Electric Company in charge of designing and installing their arc lighting systems. From 1884 to 1887 he operated his own electrical consulting business, Brown Electric Company, where he worked in inventing improved arc lighting equipment.

Brown moved to New York in 1887 and worked as consultant for the New York and Westchester Railroad, Edison General Electric, and consulted on the development of the electric chair with Governor David B. Hill and the State of New York. He also did consulting work for the City of Newark, Dayton Ohio Buffalo Electric Rail Line, and the Louisville Electric Rail Line. Up through 1912 he invented and manufactured a plastic rail bond electric contact alloy and went on to invent and manufactured a method of applying concrete with compressed air or steam.

Brown was awarded the Edward Longstreth Medal of the Franklin Institute in 1899.

== Anti-AC crusade ==
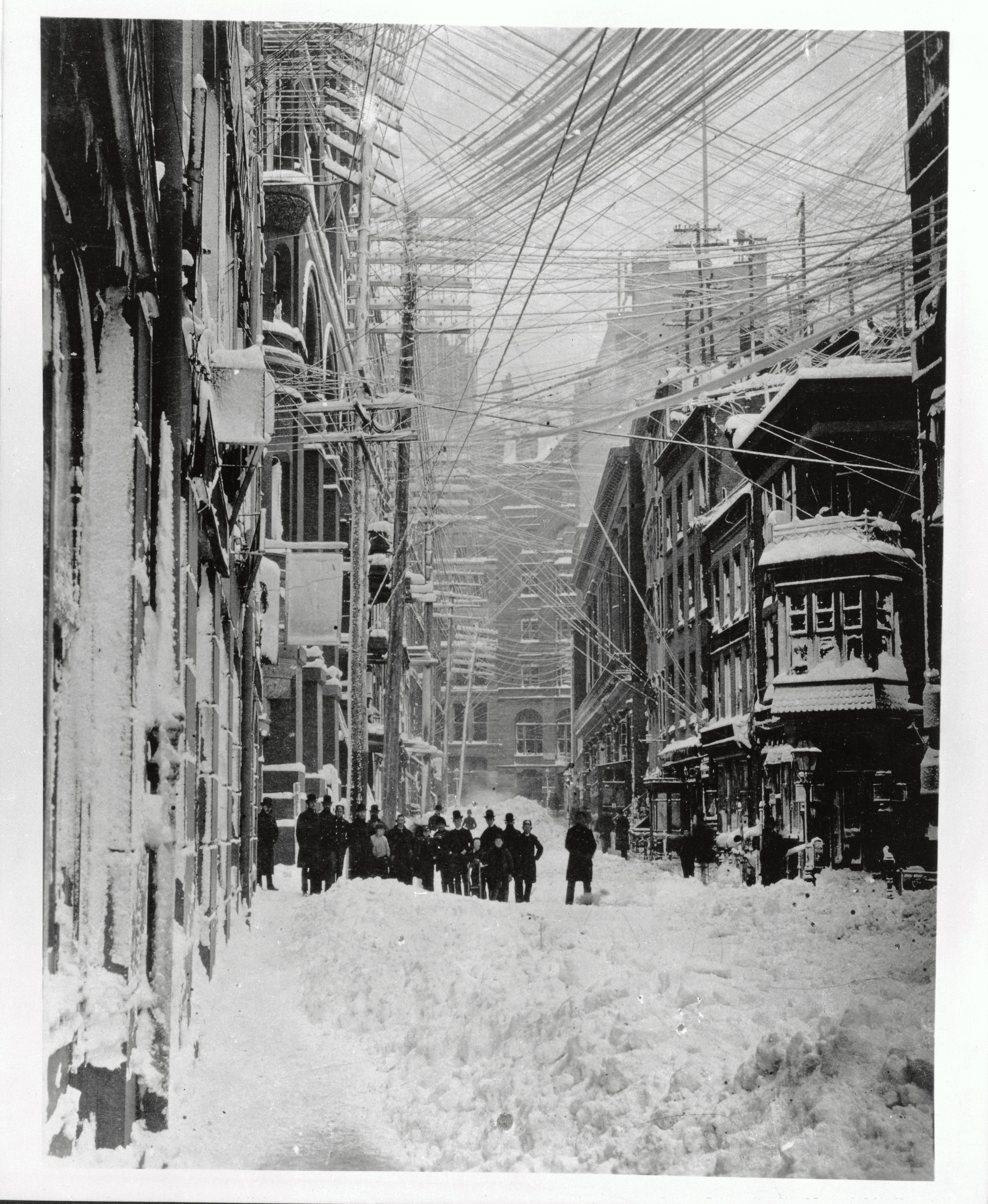
The myriad of telephone, telegraph, and AC power lines over the streets of New York City in the Great Blizzard of 1888. A boy killed by a shorted AC line caused by this storm was one of the cases cited by Brown.

After a series of deaths in New York caused by the tangle of pole mounted high voltage (up to 6,000 volts) alternating current lines Brown came to public prominence when he wrote a letter to the New York Post on June 5, 1888 describing the overhead lines as a public menace stating:

The only excuse for the use of the fatal alternating current is that it saves the company operating it [AC] from spending a larger sum of money for the heavier copper wires which are required by the safe incandescent systems. That is, the public must submit to constant danger from sudden death, in order that a corporation may pay a little larger dividend.

His crusade brought him to the attention of inventor Thomas Edison who was becoming engaged in a propaganda campaign against alternating current companies including Westinghouse Electric Company in what would come to be called the War of the currents. Edison lent Brown the uses of his West Orange, New Jersey, laboratory to prove his claims against alternating current.

After much experimentation killing a series of dogs, Brown held a public demonstration on July 30 in a lecture room at Columbia College where he demonstrated that up to 1,000 volts of DC would not kill a dog while 300 volts of AC would kill. He went on to support legislation to control and severely limit AC installations and voltages (to the point of making it an ineffective power delivery system). The legislation was unsuccessful but another bill to move AC lines underground in New York City, put forward before Brown's campaign, passed in 1889 after a further series of highly publicized deaths that year caused by alternating current.

=== Involvement in the electric chair ===
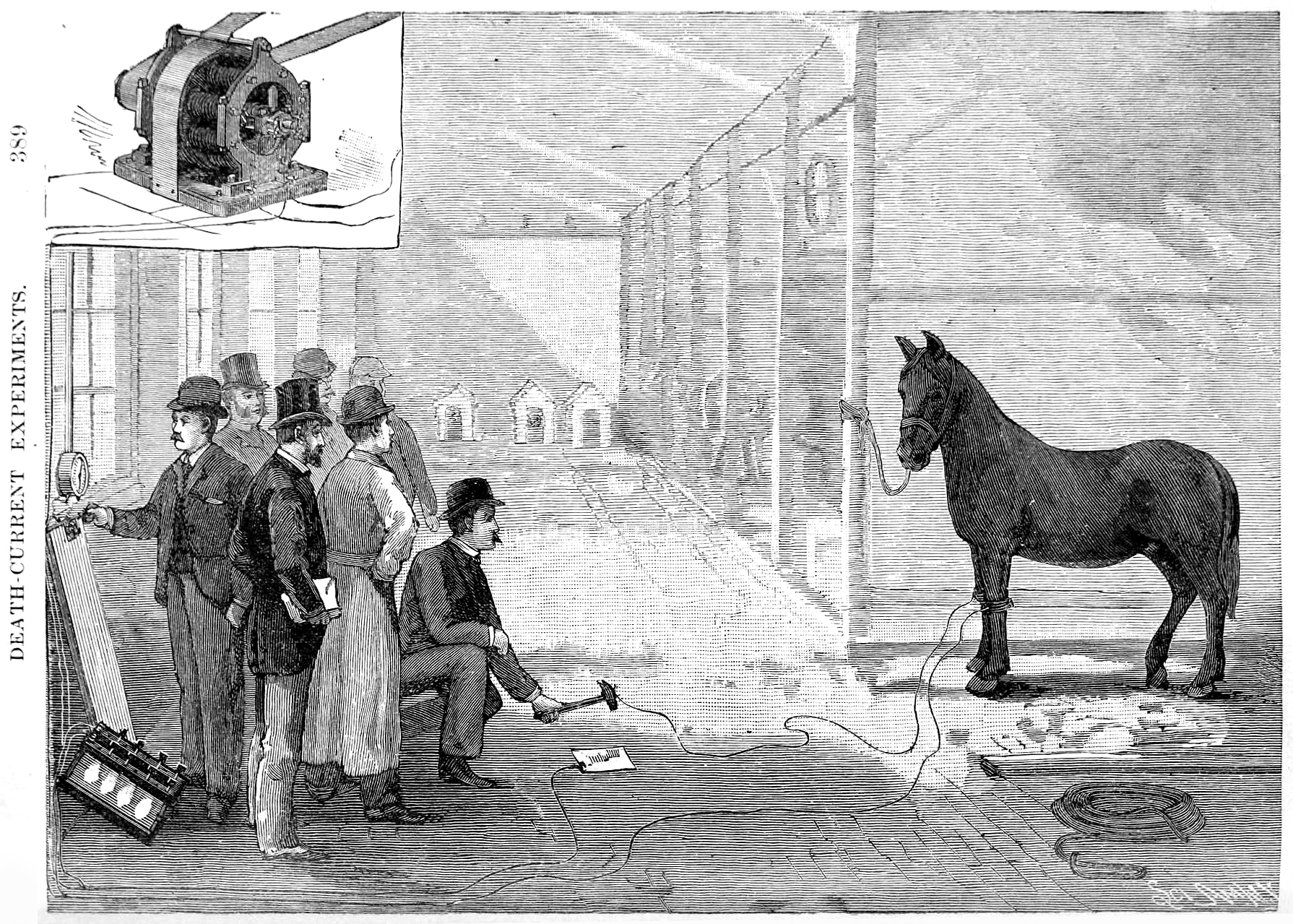
Harold Brown's December 1888 demonstration of the killing power of AC at Thomas Edison's West Orange laboratory (as depicted in Scientific American).

At the same time that Brown was campaigning against alternating current a New York state bill replacing hanging with electrocution was signed into law (June 4, 1888) and set to go into effect on January 1, 1889. A Buffalo, New York dentist named Alfred P. Southwick had been developing a method using a device similar to a dental chair, an execution device referred to as the electric chair. The law did not specify the type of current to use, or the means, so the New York Medico-Legal Society, an informal society composed of doctors and lawyers, was given the task of working out the details. Committee head Frederick Peterson, a neurologist who had assisted in the dog electrocutions at Columbia College, enlisted Brown's services as a consultant. Brown set up an experiment at Edison's West Orange laboratory on December 5, 1888 with members of the press, members of the Medico-Legal Society, the chairman of the death penalty commission, and Thomas Edison looking on. Brown used alternating current for all of his tests on animals larger than a human, including 4 calves and a lame horse, all dispatched with 750 volts of AC. Based on these results the Medico-Legal Society recommended the use of 1,000-1,500 volts of alternating current for executions and newspapers noted the AC used was half the voltage used in the power lines over the streets of American cities.

Westinghouse criticized this test as a skewed self-serving demonstration by Brown, who was again accused of being in the employ of the Edison company. Brown refuted the claims and even challenged Westinghouse to an electrical "duel," with Brown agreeing to be shocked by ever increasing amounts of DC power if Westinghouse would submit himself to the same amount of increasing AC power (first to quit loses). Westinghouse declined the offer.

Neither Edison, Westinghouse, nor Westinghouse's chief AC rival, Thomson-Houston Electric Company, wanted their equipment to be used in an execution but Brown colluded with Edison Electric and Thomson-Houston to surreptitiously acquire three Westinghouse AC generators to power the first electric chair.

Brown would continually claim he had no actual association with the Edison company although an August 1889 New York Sun story published letters stolen from Brown's office that seemed to show Brown was receiving directions from, and being paid by, the Edison company as well as Thomson-Houston, including the story on the acquisition of the Westinghouse AC generators.

== Publications ==
- Harold P. Brown's "To The Editors Of The Evening Post:" letter from the New York Post June 5, 1888 (republished on page 860 of THE ELECTRICAL ENGINEER, August 1888) or easier
- "Electrical Distribution of Heat, Light and Power WITH PARTIAL LIST OF DEATHS FROM ELECTRICAL LIGHTING APPARATUS" by Harold Pitney Brown, John Murray Mitchell - 1889
- "The New Instrument of Execution" by Harold P. Brown, The North American Review Vol. 149, No. 396 (November 1889), pp. 586-593 (jstor.org)
