= Alfred P. Southwick =

American dentist and inventor (1826–1898)

- Born: Alfred Porter Southwick; May 18, 1826
- Died: June 11, 1898 (aged 72)
- Resting place: Forest Lawn Cemetery, Buffalo, New York
- Known for: Inventing the electric chair

Alfred Porter Southwick (May 18, 1826 – June 11, 1898) was a steam-boat engineer, dentist and inventor from Buffalo, New York. He is credited with inventing the electric chair as a method of legal execution. He was also a professor at the University of Buffalo School of Dental Medicine, now known as the State University of New York at Buffalo.

== Electric chair ==
In 1881, Alfred Southwick conceived the idea of electrical execution when he heard the story of an intoxicated man who touched a live electric generator. Given that the man died so quickly, Southwick, a Quaker, concluded that electricity could be used as an alternative to hanging, making executions more humane. His first application for this phenomenon was to help invent a way to euthanize stray dogs at the Buffalo SPCA, but within a year he was publishing his ideas on using this method for capital punishment in scientific journals. As Southwick was a dentist who was accustomed to performing procedures on subjects in chairs, his device for electrical execution appeared in the form of an "electric chair".

After a series of botched hangings in the United States, there was mounting criticism of this form of capital punishment and the death penalty in general. In 1886 newly elected New York State governor David B. Hill set up a three-member death penalty commission to find a more humane form of execution. The committee included Southwick, human rights advocate and reformer Elbridge Thomas Gerry, and New York lawyer and politician Matthew Hale. They explored many forms of execution and in 1888 recommended electrocution using Southwick's electric-chair idea with metal conductors attached to the condemned person's head and feet. With their advice, the first law allowing the use of electrocution went into effect in New York State on January 1, 1889. Development of Southwick's idea into a working device was turned over to the New York Medico-Legal Society.

On August 6, 1890, William Kemmler was executed by electrocution. Southwick was present and is reported to have said, "There is the culmination of ten years work and study! We live in a higher civilization from this day."

Southwick died in 1898, aged 72, and was interred at the Forest Lawn Cemetery in Buffalo, New York.

== In popular culture ==
The Netflix series F Is for Family features a school named the Alfred P. Southwick elementary school. In season 4 the students perform in a theater play about the origins of the electric chair and the life of Alfred P. Southwick.

== See also ==
- Harold P. Brown
- Thomas Edison
