= Life and Death Row =

Docuseries about capital punishment

- Genre: Documentary
- No. of series: 4

Original release
- Network: BBC
- Release: March 17, 2014

Life and Death Row is a BBC documentary television series telling the story of capital punishment through the eyes of young people whose lives have been shaped by it.

== Series ==
=== Series 1 ===
Title	Title	Original release date
1	"Execution"	17 March 2014
Follows the final hours before the scheduled executions of two of the youngest men on death row in Texas, Richard Cobb and Anthony Haynes
2	"Judgement"	24 March 2014
Follows the trial of the Glynn County mass murder where Guy Heinze, Jr. was accused of murdering his entire family of eight in their trailer park home in Georgia.
3	"Crisis Stage"	31 March 2014
Follows law student on placement at the Death Penalty Clinic at University of Houston Law Center, mounting last-ditch appeals for two of the youngest killers facing execution, Robert Lynn Pruett and Robert Garza.

=== Series 2 ===
Title	Title	Original release date
1	"Execution"	15 February 2016
Follows the case of death row inmate Daniel Lee Lopez, who was convicted of murdering a Corpus Christi, Texas police officer by hitting him with his SUV as he was trying to evade capture following a routine traffic stop. The programme follows, Lopez, his family and city officials in the weeks and months leading up to and after his execution.
2	"Punishment"	22 February 2016
Follows the trial of Shawn Ford Jr. who was accused of the murder of Jeff and Margaret Schobert in New Franklin, Ohio. The program follows both the trial and determination of the imposition of the death penalty.
3	"Truth"	1 March 2016
Follows the cases of Austin Myers and Timothy Moseley, both charged with the murder of Justin Back. Myers and Moseley both gave different stories to the authorities. The programme follows the police investigation to establish what actually happened.
4	"Forgiveness"	14 June 2016
Follows 23-year-old TT Trottie on his journey as he prepares to lose another parent after his father, Willie Tyrone Trottie, was convicted and sentenced to death for the murder of TT's mother Barbara Canada and her brother, Titus, in Houston in May 1993, when TT was just 18 months old.

=== Series 3 ===
Series 3 was the first series following the move of BBC Three to an online-only format. Love Triangle consisted of eight shorts recounting the police investigation, trial and sentencing of the murder of Heather Strong. These episodes last for approximately 10 minutes each in contrast to the hour long episodes of series 1 and 2.

The Mass Execution consists of four 60 or 75-minute episodes looking at the eight inmates on Arkansas death row (including Ledell Lee and Marcel Williams) whose executions were pushed forward due to the expiration date on the Midazolam used in these executions.

=== Series 4 ===
Title	Title	Original release date
1	"True Conviction"	21 January 2025
Follows the case of death row inmate Ivan Cantu, who was convicted of double murder of Amy Kitchen and James Mosqueda at Dallas in 2000. The program follows Cantu, who has protested his innocence for 20 years, as well as his family and the family of the victims in the lead up to Texas' first execution of 2024.
2	"Cop Killer"	21 January 2025
Follows the trial of Patrick McDowell who was accused of the murder of deputy sheriff Joshua Moyers during a routine traffic stop near Callahan, Florida. The program follows the trial and determination of the imposition of the death penalty.
3	"Murder on the Ranch"	21 January 2025
Follows the case of death row inmate Ramiro Gonzales, who was convicted of the kidnap, rape and murder of Bridget Townsend and later kidnapping and rape of a businesswoman in 2001. The program follows the efforts of Gonzales' supporters and family to launch a successful appeal, as well as the perspective of Bridget's mother Patricia as the execution date approaches.

== Reception ==
Series One received generally positive reviews from The Independent and The Telegraph.

Series Three was praised by The Guardian, including praising the adaptation of the program to online-only mini-series.

== Awards ==
Life and Death Row was awarded a BAFTA in 2015 for Best Television Factual Series
