= Murder of Donald Lehman =

1981 murder in Arkansas, United States

Donald Lehman
- Born: 1933; United States
- Died: January 8, 1981 (aged 47); Rogers, Arkansas, U.S.
- Cause of death: Homicide

Hoyt Franklin Clines
- Born: November 18, 1956; United States
- Died: August 3, 1994 (aged 37); Cummins Unit, Lincoln County, Arkansas, U.S.
- Status: Executed by lethal injection
- Convictions: Capital murder Aggravated robbery (2 counts)
- Penalty: Death

Darryl V. Richley
- Born: April 12, 1951; United States
- Died: August 3, 1994 (aged 43); Cummins Unit, Lincoln County, Arkansas, U.S.
- Status: Executed by lethal injection
- Convictions: Capital murder Aggravated robbery (2 counts)
- Penalty: Death

James William Holmes
- Born: December 14, 1956; United States
- Died: August 3, 1994 (aged 37); Cummins Unit, Lincoln County, Arkansas, U.S.
- Status: Executed by lethal injection
- Convictions: Capital murder Aggravated robbery (2 counts)
- Penalty: Death

Michael Ray Orndorff
- Born: May 1, 1959 (age 67); United States
- Status: Incarcerated
- Convictions: Capital murder Aggravated robbery (2 counts)
- Penalty: Death; commuted to life imprisonment

Details
- Imprisoned at: East Arkansas Regional Unit

Donald Lehman (1933 – January 8, 1981) was an American man who was murdered in front of his family by four men in Arkansas. All four men – James William Holmes, Hoyt Franklin Clines, Michael Orndorff, and Darryl Richley – were convicted of capital murder and sentenced to death, albeit Orndorff's sentence was reduced to life without parole on appeal. The other three were all executed one by one on August 3, 1994. It was the first triple execution in the United States since 1962 and the first in the post-Gregg v. Georgia modern era.

== Murder ==
Donald Lehman, his wife, Virginia, and their daughter, Vicki, were at their home when four men wearing ski masks rang the doorbell and forced their way inside. The intruders shot Lehman three times and severely beat him with a motorcycle drive chain in front of his family. The intruders stole more than $1,000 and several guns, according to court documents. Holmes, Richley, Clines, and Orndorff were arrested later that day. They were tried jointly for capital murder and aggravated robbery. All of them were found guilty and sentenced to death. Orndorff later had his death sentence overturned on appeal, and Lehman's family agreed to a life sentence in his case.

== Executions ==
After the U.S. Supreme Court rejected arguments they were being treated like "hogs at a slaughter", Clines, Richley, and Holmes were all executed by lethal injection on August 3, 1994. All three of them declined to make final statements. Clines was executed first, and was pronounced dead at 7:11 p.m. Richley was pronounced dead 58 minutes later, followed by Holmes at 9:24 p.m.

== See also ==
- Capital punishment in Arkansas
- List of people executed in Arkansas
- List of people executed in the United States in 1994
