= List of people executed in the United States in 2017 =

Twenty-three people, all male, were executed in the United States in 2017, all by lethal injection. The state of Arkansas executed four people in April, ending a hiatus on executions in the state that had lasted for over 11 years. However, the state has not executed anyone since. Virginia conducted its final two executions in 2017, with the state having since abolished capital punishment in 2021.

== List of people executed in the United States in 2017 ==
No.	Date of execution	Name	Age of person			Gender	Ethnicity	State	Method	Ref.
No.	Date of execution	Name	At execution	At offense	Age difference	Gender	Ethnicity	State	Method	Ref.
1	January 11, 2017	Christopher Chubasco Wilkins	48	37	11	Male	White	Texas	Lethal injection	
2	January 18, 2017	Ricky Javon Gray	39	28	11	Male	Black	Virginia	Lethal injection	
3	January 26, 2017	Terry Darnell Edwards	43	28	15	Male	Black	Texas	Lethal injection	
4	January 31, 2017	Mark Anthony Christeson	37	18	19	Male	White	Missouri	Lethal injection	
5	March 7, 2017	Rolando Ruiz Jr.	44	20	24	Male	Hispanic	Texas	Lethal injection	
6	March 14, 2017	James Eugene Bigby	61	32	29	Male	White	Texas	Lethal injection	
7	April 20, 2017	Ledell T. Lee	51	27	24	Male	Black	Arkansas	Lethal injection	
8	April 24, 2017	Jack Harold Jones Jr.	52	30	22	Male	White	Arkansas	Lethal injection	
9	April 24, 2017	Marcel Wayne Williams	46	24	22	Male	Black	Arkansas	Lethal injection	
10	April 27, 2017	Kenneth Dewayne Williams	38	20	18	Male	Black	Arkansas	Lethal injection	
11	May 17, 2017	John W. Ledford III	45	20	25	Male	White	Georgia	Lethal injection	
12	May 26, 2017	Thomas Douglas "Tommy" Arthur	75	40	35	Male	White	Alabama	Lethal injection	
13	June 8, 2017	Robert Bryant Melson	46	22	24	Male	Black	Alabama	Lethal injection	
14	July 6, 2017	William Charles Morva	35	24	11	Male	White	Virginia	Lethal injection	
15	July 26, 2017	Ronald Ray Phillips	43	19	24	Male	White	Ohio	Lethal injection	
16	July 27, 2017	Taichin Preyor	46	33	13	Male	Black	Texas	Lethal injection	
17	August 24, 2017	Mark James Asay	53	23	30	Male	White	Florida	Lethal injection	
18	September 13, 2017	Gary Wayne Otte	45	20	25	Male	White	Ohio	Lethal injection	
19	October 5, 2017	Michael Ray Lambrix	57	22	35	Male	White	Florida	Lethal injection	
20	October 12, 2017	Robert Lynn Pruett	38	20	18	Male	White	Texas	Lethal injection	
21	October 19, 2017	Torrey Twane McNabb	40	20	20	Male	Black	Alabama	Lethal injection	
22	November 8, 2017	Patrick Charles Hannon	53	26	27	Male	White	Florida	Lethal injection	
23	November 8, 2017	Ruben Douglas Ramirez Cardenas	47	26	21	Male	Hispanic	Texas	Lethal injection	
		Average:	47 years	25 years	22 years					

== Demographics ==
Gender
Male	23	100%
Female	0	0%
Ethnicity
White	13	56%
Black	8	35%
Hispanic	2	9%
State
Texas	7	30%
Arkansas	4	17%
Alabama	3	13%
Florida	3	13%
Ohio	2	9%
Virginia	2	9%
Georgia	1	4%
Missouri	1	4%
Method
Lethal injection	23	100%
Month
January	4	17%
February	0	0%
March	2	9%
April	4	17%
May	2	9%
June	1	4%
July	3	13%
August	1	4%
September	1	4%
October	3	13%
November	2	9%
December	0	0%
Age
30–39	5	22%
40–49	11	48%
50–59	5	22%
60–69	1	4%
70–79	1	4%
Total	23	100%

== Executions in recent years ==
Number of executions
2018	25
2017	23
2016	20
Total	68

== Double execution in Arkansas ==
On April 24, 2017, Arkansas carried out back-to-back executions. Convicted rapist and serial killer Jack Harold Jones, age 52, was pronounced dead at 7:20 pm Monday. Approximately three hours later, convicted rapist and murderer Marcel Williams, age 46, was pronounced dead at 10:33 pm. Jones was sentenced to death for the 1995 rape and murder of Mary Phillips (August 18, 1959 – June 6, 1995) and the near-fatal assault of her then-10-year-old daughter, Lacy Phillips (born July 9, 1984), during a botched robbery in Bald Knob, Arkansas. Williams was sent to death row for the 1994 rape and murder of 22-year-old Stacy Errickson, whom he kidnapped from a gas station in central Arkansas.

The last double execution in Arkansas was on September 8, 1999. By conducting the double execution in 2017, Arkansas became the first U.S. state to put more than one inmate to death on the same day in 17 years. The last state to do so was Texas, which executed two murderers in August 2000. Oklahoma planned a double execution in 2014 but scrapped plans for the second one after the first (the execution of Clayton Lockett) went awry.

Arkansas executed four men in an eight-day period in 1960. The only quicker pace included quadruple executions in 1926 and 1930.

== See also ==
- List of death row inmates in the United States
- List of juveniles executed in the United States since 1976
- List of most recent executions by jurisdiction
- List of people scheduled to be executed in the United States
- List of women executed in the United States since 1976

Preceded by 2016	List of people executed in the United States in 2017	Succeeded by 2018
