= Kenneth Williams (serial killer) =

Executed American serial killer (1979–2017)

- Born: Kenneth Dewayne Williams; February 23, 1979; Pine Bluff, Arkansas, U.S.
- Died: April 27, 2017 (aged 38); Cummins Unit, Lincoln County, Arkansas, U.S.
- Cause of death: Execution by lethal injection
- Convictions: Capital murder (3 counts); Attempted capital murder; Aggravated robbery (3 counts); Kidnapping (2 counts); Theft of property (4 counts); First degree escape; Second degree battery
- Penalty: Death (August 30, 2000)

Details
- Victims: 4 (including one killed unintentionally during a high-speed chase)
- Span of crimes: 1998–1999
- Country: United States
- States: Arkansas; Missouri
- Imprisoned at: Varner Unit

Kenneth Dewayne Williams (February 23, 1979 – April 27, 2017) was an American serial killer who killed four people in Arkansas and Missouri. Originally sentenced to life without parole in Arkansas for killing a University of Arkansas pre-med student and cheerleader in 1998, Williams escaped from prison in a 500-gallon barrel of pig slop in 1999. He then shot and killed another man and stole his truck several miles away from the prison, before unintentionally killing another man in a police chase in Missouri. Williams was convicted of the murder he committed shortly after escaping prison and was sentenced to death. In 2005, he confessed to committing another murder in 1998, for which he was given an additional life sentence. Williams became the last of four inmates executed in Arkansas in April 2017.

== Early life ==
Williams' parents both had learning difficulties, and his mother was a drug addict who smoked while she was pregnant. Williams' father abused his wife and his children. According to Williams, he would frequently beat him, his mother, and his brothers. At one point, his father kidnapped his mother, holding her at gunpoint for several days.

Rarely supervised, Williams started smoking marijuana at the age of 6, and joined the Gangster Disciples and started drinking beer at the age of 9. He moved in and out of several foster homes and juvenile reform schools.

After being molested when he was 8, Williams said he started raping other children. "I grew bitter and angry; I was guilt-ridden, too ashamed to speak out, and so I suffered in silence and in loneliness, out of which came forth a vengeance and a vow: never again to be a victimized prey—to be the one on the offense, not the defense; to be the predator, not the prey. In order to survive, in my adolescent mind, I thought it better this way." Williams stopped in his pre-teen years, saying "I reached the conclusion that being the offender doesn't give you any more advantage than being a victim."

In 1996, Williams was sentenced to five years in prison for first degree escape and second degree battery. He was released from prison on April 2, 1998.

== Initial murders and incarceration ==
On December 13, 1998, Williams, then 19, abducted University of Arkansas pre-med student Dominique "Nikki" Hurd, 19, and her boyfriend, Peter Robertson, from a parking lot in Pine Bluff, Arkansas. Robertson later said he and Hurd had been taking photos with each other when Williams showed up and offered to take a photo of them together. Williams pulled out a revolver and ordered the couple into their car, before robbing them of their money, jewelry, and credit cards. He then forced Robertson to drive him to an ATM and withdraw additional cash.

Williams had Robertson drive through several dead-end streets around this time. As they drove, Williams repeatedly told the couple he would not hurt them. At one of the dead-ends, Williams had the two get out. He then had Robertson take a picture of Hurd with her dress lifted up and her underwear pulled down. Afterward, Williams had the couple get back in the car and drive to another dead-end. After they got out, Williams had them climb a fence and kneel down behind a nearby shed, and then got back into the car. After taking Hurd's purse, he asked the two where they were from. Hurd said she was from Dallas and Robertson said he was from New Jersey. Williams then replied "I don't like the niggers from Dallas anyway," and started shooting the couple, emptying his revolver before driving off. He later abandoned and burned the car. Hurd died from a gunshot wound to the head, while Robertson survived, got picked up by a passing car, and went home to call the police.

On December 18, 1998, Williams was charged with one count of capital murder, one count of attempted capital murder, two counts of kidnapping, two counts of aggravated robbery, two counts of theft of property, and one count of arson. He was convicted of all of the charges. Prosecutors sought a death sentence for Williams, but the jury gave him a life sentence. After learning that he had been spared execution, Williams taunted Hurd's family, saying "You thought I was going to die, didn't you?" Williams was sent to the Cummins Unit to serve out his life sentence.

== Prison escape, additional killings, and execution ==
On October 3, 1999, less than a month after he was sentenced to life in prison, Williams escaped by going into the kitchen and hiding inside a 500-gallon barrel of pig slop that was taken out by a truck. After the truck drove out of the prison, Williams jumped out and hid in a ditch. After hiding there for some time, he got out and ran to the highway, heading northwest. He eventually came across the home of 57-year-old Cecil Boren, a farmer and retired prison warden. Cecil was in his yard while his wife, Genie Boren, was at church. Williams stole one of Cecil's guns, a .22 caliber Ruger pistol. As Cecil walked inside, Williams shot him in the chest, then shot him six more times as he tried to flee, including once in the head. Williams then dragged his body inside, stole his wallet, some of his jewelry, several more of his guns, and other valuables. He then dressed himself in some of Cecil's clothes before taking his truck and driving north to Missouri.

The next day, Williams was spotted by an officer in Lebanon, Missouri. After initially pulling over, he suddenly drove off. This led to a high-speed chase that spanned roughly 60 miles. At one point, Williams was driving at 120 miles per hour. The chase was suddenly halted when Williams struck a vehicle in front of him. The driver, 24-year-old Culligan water delivery truck driver Michael Greenwood, was ejected and killed. After his truck was disabled by the crash, Williams fled on foot and was apprehended shortly afterward. He reportedly spat on Greenwood's body after the crash.

Williams was not prosecuted for killing Greenwood but faced charges for killing Boren. On August 29, 2000, Williams was convicted of theft of property and capital murder, with the underlying felonies of aggravated robbery and first degree escape. He was sentenced to death the following day. In May 2005, Williams wrote a letter to the Pine Bluff Commercial, apologizing for his crimes and saying he had found God.

"I hit rock bottom, and most people would say that's where I belong", Williams said. "People have always asked me, 'Why did you kill those innocent people?' I really didn't know how to answer that question, until now. When you live a sinful life away from God, anything is possible. That includes mass murder. Learn from my mistakes."

Williams also confessed to another murder committed on the same day he killed Hurd. He had robbed 36-year-old Jerrell Jenkins and shot him twice in the chest with a .357 caliber handgun. His body was discovered in a ditch by a child going to school. In December 2005, Williams pleaded guilty to capital murder, aggravated robbery, and theft of property for killing Jenkins and received another life sentence.

Williams said finding God got him to confess, writing "I take full responsibility for my actions and whatever consequences my peers see fit. Without God being in my life, I never would have confessed to these crimes. I would have denied them until I went to my grave. I know that the embarrassment and shame that I brought upon my community is unacceptable and intolerable. As a community, we are supposed to love one another and work together as one. What we do as individuals reflects upon our communities."

While on death row, Williams became an ordained minister. Twenty days before his execution, he wrote an article for The Marshall Project. In it, Williams expressed remorse for his crimes. He initially expressed frustration over his death sentence, saying "I thought: Have they forgotten I am human, or do they just not care?" However, Williams then blamed himself for being on death row in the first place, saying "Then I thought: Wasn't it my disregard for human life that got me in this situation to begin with?"

On April 27, 2017, Williams was executed by lethal injection at the Cummins Unit. He was the last of four men executed in Arkansas that year. The others were Ledell Lee, Jack Harold Jones, and Marcel Williams. Kenneth Williams' last meal consisted of two pieces of fried chicken with a side of sweet rice, BBQ pinto beans, a slice of bread, a peanut butter cookie, and a cinnamon roll.

Williams read his last words from a written statement held by a prison official:

"I humbly extend my sincerest of apologies to the families I senselessly wronged and deprived of their loved ones. The families of: Dominique Hurd, Jerrell Jenkins, Cecil Boren, Michael Greenwood. I was more than wrong. The crimes I perpetrated against you all was senseless, extremely hurtful and inexcusable. I humbly beg you your forgiveness, and pray you find the peace, healing, and closure, you all deserve. … I'm not the person I was, I've been transformed. Some things can't be undone, I seek forgiveness."

The execution drew attention after Kayla Greenwood, the daughter of Michael Greenwood, bought plane tickets for Williams' daughter, Jasmine Johnson, who he had not seen in 17 years, and his 3-year-old granddaughter, who he had never met, so they could fly from Washington State to Arkansas to meet with him for the last time. Kayla said she had forgiven Williams and did not want him to die. However, the families of Boren and Hurd supported the execution. Boren's wife, daughter and their family told a newspaper that they waited for justice to be finally served with Williams's execution. In response to the queries surrounding the execution of Williams and the three others before him, Hutchinson stated that he "absolutely made the right decision" to ensure the law run its course and fulfill the ends of justice.

Williams' execution was the subject of a BBC Three episode of Life and Death Row.

== See also ==
- Capital punishment in Arkansas
- List of most recent executions by jurisdiction
- List of people executed in Arkansas
- List of people executed in the United States in 2017
- List of serial killers in the United States

Executions carried out in Arkansas
Preceded by Marcel Williams April 24, 2017	Kenneth Williams; April 27, 2017	Succeeded by most recent
Executions carried out in the United States
Preceded by Marcel Williams – Arkansas April 24, 2017	Kenneth Williams – Arkansas; April 27, 2017	Succeeded by John Ledford III – Georgia May 17, 2017
