= List of people executed in the United States in 1994 =

Thirty-one people, all male, were executed in the United States in 1994, twenty-three by lethal injection, six by electrocution, one by gas chamber and one by hanging. Idaho, Maryland, and Nebraska both carried out their first post-Furman executions. Washington and Illinois both carried out their first involuntary executions since the 1960s.

Arkansas carried out a double execution and a triple execution, the first such executions in the United States since 1965 and 1962, respectively.

== List of people executed in the United States in 1994 ==
| No. | Date of execution | Name | Age of person | | | Gender | Ethnicity | State | Method | Ref. |
| No. | Date of execution | Name | At execution | At offense | Age difference | Gender | Ethnicity | State | Method | Ref. |
|---|---|---|---|---|---|---|---|---|---|---|
| 1 | January 6, 1994 | Keith Eugene Wells | 31 | 28 | 3 | Male | White | Idaho | Lethal injection | |
| 2 | February 2, 1994 | Harold Amos Barnard | 51 | 37 | 14 | Male | White | Texas | Lethal injection | |
| 3 | March 3, 1994 | Johnny Watkins Jr. | 33 | 23 | 10 | Male | Black | Virginia | Electrocution | |
| 4 | March 31, 1994 | Freddie Lee Webb Sr. | 33 | 25 | 8 | Male | Black | Texas | Lethal injection | |
| 5 | March 31, 1994 | William Henry Hance | 42 | 26 | 16 | Male | Black | Georgia | Electrocution | |
| 6 | April 4, 1994 | Richard Lee Beavers | 38 | 30 | 8 | Male | White | Texas | Lethal injection | |
| 7 | April 22, 1994 | Roy Allen Stewart | 38 | 22 | 16 | Male | White | Florida | Electrocution | |
| 8 | April 26, 1994 | Larry Norman Anderson | 41 | 29 | 12 | Male | White | Texas | Lethal injection | |
| 9 | April 27, 1994 | Timothy Wilson Spencer | 32 | 25 | 7 | Male | Black | Virginia | Electrocution | |
| 10 | May 3, 1994 | Paul Rougeau | 46 | 30 | 16 | Male | Black | Texas | Lethal injection | |
| 11 | May 10, 1994 | John Wayne Gacy | 52 | 29 | 23 | Male | White | Illinois | Lethal injection | |
| 12 | May 11, 1994 | Jonas Hoten Whitmore | 50 | 42 | 8 | Male | White | Arkansas | Lethal injection | |
| 13 | May 11, 1994 | Edward Charles Pickens | 39 | 21 | 18 | Male | Black | Arkansas | Lethal injection | |
| 14 | May 17, 1994 | John Frederick Thanos | 45 | 41 | 4 | Male | White | Maryland | Lethal injection | |
| 15 | May 27, 1994 | Stephen Ray Nethery | 33 | 20 | 13 | Male | White | Texas | Lethal injection | |
| 16 | May 27, 1994 | Charles Rodman Campbell | 39 | 27 | 12 | Male | White | Washington | Hanging | |
| 17 | June 14, 1994 | Denton Alan Crank | 38 | 28 | 10 | Male | White | Texas | Lethal injection | |
| 18 | June 15, 1994 | David Scarborough Lawson | 38 | 25 | 13 | Male | White | North Carolina | Gas chamber | |
| 19 | June 23, 1994 | Andre Stanley Deputy | 45 | 30 | 15 | Male | Black | Delaware | Lethal injection | |
| 20 | August 2, 1994 | Robert Nelson Drew Sr. | 35 | 23 | 12 | Male | White | Texas | Lethal injection | |
| 21 | August 3, 1994 | Hoyt Franklin Clines | 37 | 24 | 13 | Male | White | Arkansas | Lethal injection | |
| 22 | August 3, 1994 | Darryl V. Richley | 43 | 29 | 14 | Male | White | Arkansas | Lethal injection | |
| 23 | August 3, 1994 | James William Holmes | 37 | 24 | 13 | Male | White | Arkansas | Lethal injection | |
| 24 | September 2, 1994 | Harold Lamont Otey | 43 | 26 | 17 | Male | Black | Nebraska | Electrocution | |
| 25 | September 16, 1994 | Jessie Gutierrez | 29 | 24 | 5 | Male | Hispanic | Texas | Lethal injection | |
| 26 | September 20, 1994 | George Douglas Lott | 47 | 45 | 2 | Male | White | Texas | Lethal injection | |
| 27 | October 5, 1994 | Walter Key Williams | 32 | 19 | 13 | Male | Black | Texas | Lethal injection | |
| 28 | November 22, 1994 | Warren Eugene Bridge | 34 | 19 | 15 | Male | White | Texas | Lethal injection | |
| 29 | December 6, 1994 | Herman Robert Charles Clark Jr. | 48 | 34 | 14 | Male | Black | Texas | Lethal injection | |
| 30 | December 8, 1994 | Gregory Duane Resnover | 43 | 29 | 14 | Male | Black | Indiana | Electrocution | |
| 31 | December 11, 1994 | Raymond Carl Kinnamon | 53 | 43 | 10 | Male | White | Texas | Lethal injection | |
| | | Average: | 40 years | 28 years | 12 years | | | | | |

== Demographics ==
Gender
| Male | 31 | 100% |
| Female | 0 | 0% |
Ethnicity
| White | 19 | 61% |
| Black | 11 | 35% |
| Hispanic | 1 | 3% |
State
| Texas | 14 | 45% |
| Arkansas | 5 | 16% |
| Virginia | 2 | 6% |
| Delaware | 1 | 3% |
| Florida | 1 | 3% |
| Georgia | 1 | 3% |
| Idaho | 1 | 3% |
| Illinois | 1 | 3% |
| Indiana | 1 | 3% |
| Maryland | 1 | 3% |
| Nebraska | 1 | 3% |
| North Carolina | 1 | 3% |
| Washington | 1 | 3% |
Method
| Lethal injection | 23 | 74% |
| Electrocution | 6 | 19% |
| Gas chamber | 1 | 3% |
| Hanging | 1 | 3% |
Month
| January | 1 | 3% |
| February | 1 | 3% |
| March | 3 | 10% |
| April | 4 | 13% |
| May | 7 | 23% |
| June | 3 | 10% |
| July | 0 | 0% |
| August | 4 | 13% |
| September | 3 | 10% |
| October | 1 | 3% |
| November | 1 | 3% |
| December | 3 | 10% |
Age
| 20–29 | 1 | 3% |
| 30–39 | 16 | 52% |
| 40–49 | 10 | 32% |
| 50–59 | 4 | 13% |
| Total | 31 | 100% |

== Executions in recent years ==
Number of executions
| 1995 | 56 |
| 1994 | 31 |
| 1993 | 38 |
| Total | 125 |

| Preceded by 1993 | List of people executed in the United States in 1994 | Succeeded by 1995 |
