= Eric Nance =

American murderer (1960–2005)

- Born: Eric Randall Nance; January 9, 1960
- Died: November 28, 2005 (aged 45); Cummins Unit, Arkansas, U.S.
- Status: Executed by lethal injection
- Conviction: Capital murder
- Penalty: Death (March 31, 1994)

Details
- Victims: 1
- Date: October 11, 1993

Eric Randall Nance (January 9, 1960 – November 28, 2005) was an American man who was convicted of murder in the state of Arkansas. Nance was executed in 2005.

== Murder ==
On October 11, 1993, 18-year-old Julie Heath was driving on U.S. Highway 270 between Malvern and Hot Springs, Arkansas, to visit her boyfriend in Hot Springs. Nance stated that he stopped to help Heath after her car broke down and offered her a ride to Malvern. The prosecution said that Nance then raped and murdered her. He was later seen in a convenience store wearing no shoes, socks, or shirt. According to the clerk, there appeared to be fresh dark, damp stains on his overalls.

Heath's body was found on October 18, 1993, by a hunter. Her throat had been cut. Photographs of the scene show that she was fully clothed, but her belt buckle was partially undone, her pants zipper was not fully up, and the left shoulder of her shirt was torn. The shirt was also on inside out. The medical examiner also reported that her socks and panties were on inside out and her bra was pulled up around the neck and shoulder area. A pubic hair located in Nance's pickup was said by an expert to be microscopically identical to that of Heath.

Nance said he accidentally killed Heath. According to defense testimony, she had become hysterical after seeing a utility knife and began to kick at him. Putting up his hand to stop her, he accidentally lodged the knife in her throat. This version of events was told at the trial by his brother and sister, to whom Nance had told his version of events.

The TV show Murder Comes to Town on the Investigation Discovery channel presented this murder mystery in Season 5 Episode 7 "Something's Not Right". Later, his sister Belinda, told her story on the Evil Lives Here Season 9 Episode 5 "They Say I Killed My Brother." She tells the story about how Nance actually asked her to retrieve and destroy evidence, specifically the murder weapon, and she instead chose to turn it over to authorities.

Julie's mother, Nancy Heath, committed suicide 15 months after her daughter's murder.

== Trial and appeals ==
Nance was found guilty of capital felony murder, with attempted rape as the underlying felony. During the sentencing phase of the trial, it was revealed that five months before the murder, Nance had been released from a twenty-year sentence for beating two Oklahoma girls in 1982. The jury found that there were no mitigating circumstances in the case, and recommended that the judge sentence Nance to death, which he did on March 31, 1994.

His lawyers argued that it would be unconstitutional (Atkins v. Virginia) to execute Nance, as he was intellectually disabled. A psychologist said that Nance had an IQ below 70, whereas a psychiatrist testified that he found Nance to have an IQ of 105. The defense also argued that DNA tests could show that the pubic hair did not come from Heath.

On November 17, 2005, the Arkansas Parole Board recommended, with a vote of 6–1, that Governor Mike Huckabee deny clemency for Nance. The dissenting vote was from one member who wanted to stay the execution to give more time to determine if Nance was intellectually disabled.

The execution was briefly stayed on November 17 by United States federal judge James Moody of the Eastern District of Arkansas. The stay was vacated by the 8th Circuit Court of Appeals on November 19.

== Execution ==
Originally the execution was scheduled for 8 p.m. on November 28. There was a temporary stay order by Justice Clarence Thomas to give him more time to review the case. Thomas was the justice responsible for handling emergency cases from Arkansas. The stay was vacated shortly afterwards and all appeals denied.

Nance asked for a final meal of two bacon cheeseburgers, french fries, two pints of chocolate chip cookie dough ice cream, and two Coca-Colas. He made no last statement. Given a lethal injection, he was pronounced dead at 9:24 p.m. CST. It was the first execution by the state of Arkansas since Charles Laverne Singleton on January 6, 2004.

== Writings and song ==
In 1995, Nance began a decade-long correspondence with James Nelson, an Irish tenor who is critical of the death penalty. Through their friendship, Nelson realized "that Eric's only means of escape from [his] hell's purgatory was through his letters, his memories and his dreams." With fellow Celtic Tenors Niall Morris and Matthew Gilsenan, Nelson set a poem of Nance's to music and entitled it, "Eric's Song". After Nance's execution, the Celtic Tenors released the song on their album, Remember Me.

== See also ==
- Capital punishment in Arkansas
- Capital punishment in the United States
- List of people executed in Arkansas
- List of people executed in the United States in 2005

Executions carried out in Arkansas
Preceded by Charles Singleton January 6, 2004	Eric Nance; November 28, 2005	Succeeded by Ledell Lee April 20, 2017
Executions carried out in the United States
Preceded by Elias Syriani – North Carolina November 18, 2005	Eric Nance – Arkansas; November 28, 2005	Succeeded by John R. Hicks – Ohio November 29, 2005
