= Paul Ruiz and Earl Van Denton =

Pair of serial killers and prison escapees executed in Arkansas

- Ruiz (left) and Van Denton (right) in 1981
- Born: Paul Ruiz: October 20, 1947; Earl Van Denton: December 13, 1949
- Died: Paul Ruiz: January 8, 1997 (aged 49) Cummins Unit, Lincoln County, Arkansas, U.S.; Earl Van Denton: January 8, 1997 (aged 47); Cummins Unit, Lincoln County, Arkansas, U.S.
- Cause of death: Execution by lethal injection
- Convictions: Oklahoma; Ruiz: Robbery with firearm Denton: First-degree murder Arkansas; Capital murder (2 counts)
- Penalty: Oklahoma; Life imprisonment Arkansas; Death

Details
- Victims: Ruiz: 7; Denton: 8
- Span of crimes: June 27, 1977 – July 1, 1977
- Country: United States (Arkansas, Oklahoma, Louisiana)
- Date apprehended: July 8, 1977

Paul Ruiz (October 20, 1947 – January 8, 1997) and Earl Van Denton (December 13, 1949 – January 8, 1997) were a pair of serial killers who were originally prisoners serving life sentences at the Oklahoma State Penitentiary, from where they escaped on June 23, 1977. Over a two-week period, the duo committed multiple murders in Oklahoma, Louisiana and Arkansas. Ruiz and Denton were accused of killing Melvin Short in Oklahoma, before they allegedly killed Jimmy Cockrell, Ray Jones and Alton Wilson in Louisiana, and subsequently murdered two more people – Marshal Marvin Richie of the Magazine Police Department and park ranger Opal Lee James – in Arkansas. The duo were suspected to be responsible for the 1977 disappearance and alleged murder of Gerald Tiffee in Oklahoma.

Ruiz and Denton were both arrested in Portland, Oregon and extradited back to Arkansas to stand trial for capital murder charges pertaining to the deaths of Richie and James. The pair were found guilty and sentenced to death by the courts of Arkansas in 1978, although they did not stand trial for the other killings they committed in Oklahoma and Louisiana. Subsequently, after several appeals and a retrial, both Denton and Ruiz were executed at the Cummins Unit on January 8, 1997.

== Background and murders ==
On June 23, 1977, two prisoners escaped from an Oklahoma prison and embarked on a two-week killing spree that left at least six to seven people dead in Oklahoma, Louisiana and Arkansas.

=== Prior convictions and escape ===
The two escapees, 29-year-old Paul Ruiz and 27-year-old Earl Van Denton, were incarcerated at the Oklahoma State Penitentiary, where they were both serving life sentences for different crimes. In the case of Ruiz, in July 1976, he robbed a liquor store in Custer County, and was thus found guilty of robbery with firearm and sentenced to life in prison. As for Denton, he and another man named Paul Mayabb were both convicted of the 1970 murder of William "Willie" Droke on October 1, 1975; Denton had reportedly killed Droke in a motel room by beating him unconscious with a bottle and telephone receiver before fatally beating him with a shovel. Denton and Mayabb were both sentenced to life imprisonment for the murder, although Mayabb's life term was commuted to 50 years by the Oklahoma Pardon and Parole Board in 1979.

Ruiz, Denton and 18 other inmates were tasked with tearing down a brick factory near the prison when the both of them, together with a third prisoner named Elmer Finin (who was serving life for second-degree murder), decided to escape. When lunchtime arrived for the inmates, they were all placed in a nearby empty building to have their lunch. The door to the building was left unguarded, and the trio took the opportunity to flee the building.

Subsequently, the trio went their separate ways, with Ruiz and Denton remaining together during their escape while Finin went another way alone. Four months after he escaped, Finin, who worked at a local service station after the prison break, was arrested in Hot Springs on October 31, 1977. Finin was sent back to the Oklahoma State Penitentiary to continue serving his sentence, and he died in prison four years later on October 21, 1981.

=== Killing spree ===
Meanwhile, after they separated from Finin, both Denton and Ruiz travelled across several states, including Oklahoma, Louisiana and Arkansas, where they committed an estimated total of seven murders.

Gerald Leon Tiffee

On June 27, 1977, four days after both Ruiz and Denton escaped the Oklahoma State Penitentiary, 27-year-old Gerald Leon Tiffee disappeared in Boswell, Oklahoma. Ruiz and Denton were suspected to have killed Tiffee and stolen his truck, although the circumstances surrounding Tiffee's manner of death or the whereabouts of his body remains unknown. At one point in 1978, a set of skeletal remains were found in Texas, and while it was initially reported to be Tiffee's, forensic tests confirmed that the skeleton did not belong to Tiffee, and till today, the body of Tiffee was never found.

Jimmy Cockrell

On June 28, 1977, both Ruiz and Denton killed 38-year-old James "Jimmy" Cockrell in Colfax, Louisiana.

Reportedly, sometime after their arrival in Louisiana from Oklahoma, Ruiz and Denton encountered Cockrell while he was leaning on his motorcycle parked somewhere in Colfax, and subsequent shot to death.

Ray Jones and Alton Wilson

On the same date of Cockrell's death, Ruiz and Denton allegedly killed two fishermen, 66-year-old Alton Wilson and 65-year-old Ray Jones Sr., in nearby Franklinton, Louisiana.

The corpses of both Wilson and Jones were discovered in a gravel pit near Franklinton on April 29, 1978, nearly ten months after they went missing. Under unspecified circumstances, the victims were murdered by Ruiz and Denton before the corpses were hidden in a truck and disposed of by being submerged in the pit. According to first-hand autopsy findings, the men did not have any bullet holes, suggesting that the deaths of Wilson and Jones were not caused by shooting but by other possible means like asphyxiation or drowning.

One notable fact was that when the bodies of Jones and Wilson were found, their corpses were hidden inside the truck of Gerald Tiffee, the suspected first murder victim of the Ruiz-Denton case, and this also provided a connection between the disappearance of Tiffee and the two murderers.

Marvin Richie and Opal James

On June 29, 1977, after committing the murders in Louisiana, both Ruiz and Denton fled to Magazine, Arkansas, where they murdered two law enforcement officers, Marshal Marvin Richie of the Magazine Police Department and park ranger Opal Lee James.

42-year-old Marvin Richie responded to a report of a stranded motorist near Scott Creek Road, thus encountering Ruiz and Denton. According to sources, at 9am, Richie radioed the Booneville Police Department to request a license check, but he never responded to subsequent radio calls, and about half an hour later, a search was conducted to trace Richie's whereabouts. Witnesses later reported seeing Richie handcuffed in the back seat of his patrol car, which was being driven through Blue Mountain by two men, identified as Ruiz and Denton.

Prior to 1:30pm, when they drove their truck through Ashley Creek Landing, two park rangers, 27-year-old David Small and 58-year-old Opal James, who were both affiliated with the United States Army Corps of Engineers, encountered both Ruiz and Denton at the area, and they were both attacked and overpowered by Ruiz and Denton. Small and Richie were forced into Richie's patrol car at gunpoint, and they were both shot by Denton and Ruiz; Richie died as a result of a gunshot wound to the brain, while Small survived despite suffering from a single gunshot wound to his chest, and the patrol car was eventually found at 1:30pm. As for James, he was abducted by Ruiz and Denton into the rangers' truck and later shot to death; his body was found inside the truck, which was abandoned 40 miles from Magazine.

James Melvin Short

On July 1, 1977, 40-year-old taxi driver James Melvin Short became the seventh victim to be killed by Ruiz and Denton.

It was alleged that Short was shot and killed in Purcell, Oklahoma, with the two men stealing his taxi and fled to Oregon in it, after they drove back to Oklahoma in another stolen truck and therefore murdered Short. The body of Short was found five days later on July 6, 1977, in Chickasha, Oklahoma. It was also suspected that Short was kidnapped before his death, and that Short was actually a second cousin to Denton's ex-wife, although it was unlikely that this relationship was part of whichever motive behind Short's fatal shooting.

=== Arrest ===
Meanwhile, the authorities placed both Ruiz and Denton on the wanted list, and sought to arrest the pair after they were linked to at least some of the murders they committed across Oklahoma, Arkansas and Louisiana. The manhunt also expanded to Mexico, with agents of the FBI joining the search operation. Eventually, on July 8, 1977, the two murderers were caught in Portland, Oregon. Upon their arrests, the pair faced multiple charges of murder from Arkansas, Louisiana and Oklahoma for the serial killings they committed.

After the apprehension of the pair, the Arkansas governor David Pryor requested to have the duo extradited back to Arkansas first to stand trial for murdering Marvin Richie and Opal James. An agreement was eventually reached in August 1977 to extradite the men back to Arkansas. Before the men stood trial, it was reported in December 1977 that an estimated cost of $100,000 to $500,000 was incurred to finance the prosecution of the duo for capital murder – which warranted the death penalty – in Logan County (where the murders of Richie and James occurred).

== Trials of Ruiz and Denton ==
On April 17, 1978, both Earl Denton and Paul Ruiz began to stand trial before the Logan County Circuit Court for the murders of Marvin Richie and Opal James in Arkansas. Prosecuting attorney Paul X. Williams Jr. announced his intent to seek the death penalty for both men; under Arkansas state law, the offence of capital murder carried a potential sentence of death or life imprisonment without the possibility of parole.

On April 27, 1978, the jury returned with their verdict and found both men guilty of capital murder after 47 minutes of deliberation.

On that same day, after taking about an hour to decide the sentence, the same jury unanimously imposed the death penalty for both Ruiz and Denton, who were both formally sentenced to death via the electric chair by Judge David Partain. Additionally, both Ruiz and Denton were scheduled to be executed on December 4, 1978, although it was stayed while pending a mandatory judicial review by the Arkansas Supreme Court.

This was the only murder trial both men faced for their multi-state serial murders. Upon the conviction of the duo in Arkansas, the Oklahoma authorities sought the extradition of the pair to Oklahoma to stand trial for the murder of James Melvin Short, but by 1997, Ruiz and Denton did not face prosecution for the murder of Short.

== Appeals ==
After they were both condemned to death row, Paul Ruiz and Earl Denton spent the next 18 years filing multiple appeals to overturn their death sentences.

=== First re-sentencing trial ===
In January 1979, before the commencement of their appellate process, one of the killers, Paul Ruiz, participated in a large-scale prison escape attempt with another 11 prisoners at the Cummins Unit, where he and Denton were held on death row. Ruiz was quickly caught before he could cross the fence and leave the prison; Denton did not take part in the escape plot.

On June 4, 1979, the Arkansas Supreme Court allowed the direct appeals of both Ruiz and Denton, and overturned the death sentences of both men due to procedural errors, and thus further ordered that the duo be re-sentenced by the trial court on a date to be determined. A re-trial was scheduled in September 1979, and the Arkansas state prosecutors expressed their intent to once again seek the death penalty for both men.

On October 2, 1979, after a re-trial, a Conway County jury deliberated for an hour before they found Denton and Ruiz guilty of capital murder, marking the second time they were convicted of the murders of Opal James and Marvin Richie.

On October 3, 1979, a day after they were re-convicted of the two Arkansas slayings, both Earl Denton and Paul Ruiz were once again sentenced to death by Conway County Circuit Court Judge Charles Eddy upon the jury's unanimous recommendation for capital punishment. An execution date was set on June 3, 1980, for both men, although their executions would be postponed while pending a mandatory review by the Arkansas Supreme Court.

On June 8, 1981, the Arkansas Supreme Court dismissed the appeals of the pair against their second death sentences.

On November 30, 1981, the follow-up appeals of both Ruiz and Denton were denied by the U.S. Supreme Court.

=== Further appeals and second re-sentencing trial ===
On July 18, 1983, the Arkansas Supreme Court rejected the third appeal of both Ruiz and Denton.

On January 31, 1985, the 8th U.S. Circuit Court of Appeals allowed the appeals of Ruiz and Denton and remanded their case to the lower federal courts to review their death sentences.

On November 20, 1986, the 8th U.S. Circuit Court of Appeals upheld the convictions of the pair, but ordered another re-sentencing hearing after vacating the death sentences of both men a second time.

A second re-sentencing trial was conducted in August 1987, and in the end, the trial court re-imposed the death sentences on Denton and Ruiz. On June 12, 1989, the fourth appeal of the pair was once again denied by the Arkansas Supreme Court.

=== Final appeals ===
On August 2, 1994, the pair's federal appeal was rejected by U.S. District Judge Garnett Thomas Eisele of the U.S. District Court for the Eastern District of Arkansas.

On December 11, 1995, the 8th U.S. Circuit Court of Appeals dismissed the joint appeal of Denton and Ruiz.

On November 11, 1996, the U.S. Supreme Court dismissed the final appeals of both Denton and Ruiz, and subsequently, their executions were scheduled to be conducted on January 8, 1997. The pair were also transferred from the death row section of the Varner Unit to the Cummins Unit, where the state of Arkansas carry out death sentences.

The final recourse for both men was to appeal to the Arkansas governor for clemency. Denton also did not appeal for clemency, while Ruiz petitioned for clemency from Arkansas Governor Mike Huckabee, who chose to not commute Ruiz's death sentence to life and rejected Ruiz's plea, after the Arkansas Parole Board recommended the governor to refuse clemency on December 30, 1996.

== Execution ==
On January 8, 1997, 49-year-old Paul Ruiz and 47-year-old Earl Van Denton were both put to death by lethal injection at the Cummins Unit. On that same day, another Arkansas death row prisoner, 30-year-old Kirt Douglas Wainwright, who was found guilty of the 1988 robbery-murder of convenience store clerk Barbara Smith in Prescott, was executed at the same prison as the pair. This marked the second and most recent triple execution to be conducted in Arkansas on the same date since the 1976 re-instatement of capital punishment in the United States.

Denton was reportedly the first to be executed, partly because his inmate identification number was the lowest, and his official time of death was 7:09pm. Less than an hour later, Ruiz was the next to be put to death, and he was pronounced dead at 8pm. Wainwright himself was executed and confirmed dead at 9:50pm after the U.S. Supreme Court heard his appeal, which delayed the execution procedure for about 40 minutes before the appeal was ultimately rejected. Before their executions, Denton and Ruiz did not make any final statements; the pair were also the longest-serving prisoners on Arkansas's death row. Prior to their executions, Ruiz ate a Caesar salad as his last meal, while Denton declined a last meal offer.

In response to the execution of Denton, Bill Griffitts, whose nephew William Droke was murdered by Denton back in 1970 before the 1977 prison escape and killing spree, commented that Denton (as well as the co-defendant Paul Mayabb) should have been executed for the murder of his nephew rather than receiving life in prison, because it would have likely prevented Denton from committing the 1977 serial killings. Griffitts also said that his sister (also Droke's mother) had died from Alzheimer's disease several years before the execution, and for the remaining years of her life after the death of her son, Droke's mother's life was permanently marred by the emotional impact of her son's killing.

Additionally, Virginia Hamilton, the daughter of Marvin Richie, stated that she hated the pair for killing her father and destroying the lives of herself and her mother; Hamilton was 14 when her father was murdered. Opal James's daughter, Anne Jester, also said that she gained some relief after her father's murderers were pronounced dead, and Jester revealed that throughout the years before the execution of Ruiz and Denton, she kept having nightmares that the pair escaped prison and harmed her, which she hoped would stop after the duo's death sentences were carried out.

== Aftermath ==
In the aftermath of the Ruiz and Denton executions, the double murder of Marvin Richie and Opal James remained as one of the most infamous murders to happen in Arkansas.

In 2017, 40 years after the murders, Virginia Hamilton, Richie's daughter, who was 14 when the murder occurred, expressed in an interview that back then before discovering her father's death, she was in a state of panic while trying to reach him by radio after he failed to come home for lunch, and as a result of her father's murder, Hamilton left school at 16 to support her family and was even given a special license to drive her mother, who was never the same after losing her husband. To this day, Hamilton marked the anniversary of her father's death by releasing balloons in his memory and left flowers on his grave.

As for Anne Jester, the daughter of Opal James who was 25 when the incident happened, she recalled that the family had to wait for two days with mounting anxiety before the discovery of her father's body and confirmation of his death, which only deepened the trauma. While she did not actively commemorate her father, Jester said that she knew her father would not want her to live in sorrow and wished to see her move on. Due to them losing their fathers in the same manner, both Jester and Hamilton bonded and remained in contact throughout the years after the killings.

== See also ==
- Capital punishment in Arkansas
- List of people executed in Arkansas
- List of people executed in the United States in 1997
- List of serial killers in the United States
