= John Edward Swindler =

American murderer (1944–1990)

- Born: May 12, 1944; Columbia, South Carolina, U.S.
- Died: June 18, 1990 (aged 46); Cummins Unit, Arkansas, U.S.
- Status: Executed by electrocution
- Convictions: Arkansas; Capital murder South Carolina; Murder (2 counts); Kidnapping (2 counts)
- Penalty: Arkansas; Death (February 26, 1977); South Carolina; Life imprisonment

Details
- Victims: 3–4
- States: South Carolina, Arkansas, and possibly Florida

John Edward Swindler (May 12, 1944 – June 18, 1990) was an American murderer and suspected serial killer who was executed by the state of Arkansas for the 1976 murder of a Fort Smith police officer. He was also convicted of the murders of two teenagers in Columbia, South Carolina, and was charged but never convicted of another murder in Florida. Swindler was the first person to be executed by the state of Arkansas since 1964, and is the only person to have been executed in the electric chair in Arkansas since the reinstatement of capital punishment in 1976.

== Murders ==
Swindler shot and killed police officer Randy Basnett in the afternoon of September 24, 1976. Basnett had stopped at a service station at the Kelley Highway exit in Fort Smith, Arkansas, when Swindler also stopped there in a stolen car with a South Carolina license plate. Swindler was returning to Leavenworth, Kansas to settle some personal grudges that had arisen when he had been imprisoned there. Passing the I-540 exit on I-40 near Van Buren, Arkansas, the illiterate Swindler became confused and exited, driving across the Arkansas River and into Fort Smith. That morning, Basnett had been briefed to be on the lookout for Swindler, who was the suspect in the double murders of teenagers Gregory Becknell and Dorothy Ann Rhodes in South Carolina and other felonies in Georgia and South Carolina. The briefing contained information about Swindler's description, the car he was thought to be driving, and the fact that he was considered to be armed and dangerous. After Basnett noted Swindler and the stolen car, he radioed dispatchers that Swindler was at the service station. Back-up officers were immediately dispatched to his location.

Before additional help arrived, Basnett approached Swindler's car and asked for identification. Without warning, Swindler pulled out a revolver and shot Basnett twice in the chest. Basnett, who was standing beside the car, returned fire before collapsing, slightly wounding Swindler. Swindler attempted to flee, but being unfamiliar with Fort Smith, took a road that trailed off into a dead end in a soybean field near the Arkansas River. He was captured there within minutes by police officers who had answered Basnett's call. When officers arrested Swindler, he had several weapons and hundreds of rounds of ammunition in his possession.

Basnett died in the ambulance on the way to Sparks Regional Medical Center.

In addition to the Arkansas and South Carolina killings, Swindler was also a suspect in the 1975 murder of 19-year-old Jeffrey McNerney in Florida. He was never tried for that case.

== Execution ==
A 1983 state law made lethal injection the only method of execution in Arkansas. However, inmates who had been sentenced to death before the legislation was adopted were allowed to choose between lethal injection and electrocution. When Charles Laverne Singleton chose lethal injection, Swindler earned the distinction of being the last inmate to die in Arkansas' electric chair.

Swindler refused to choose between lethal injection and the electric chair, according to the Arkansas Department of Correction. By not choosing, Swindler effectively selected electrocution. Warden David White said Swindler might have wanted the notoriety of being the last Arkansas inmate to die in the electric chair. His was also the only execution in the new electric chair constructed by the state in the 1970s.

Swindler was the first person executed by the state of Arkansas since Furman v. Georgia, 408 U.S. 238 (1972), after new capital punishment laws were passed in Arkansas and came into force on March 23, 1973.

== See also ==
- List of people executed in Arkansas
- List of people executed in the United States in 1990
- List of people executed by electrocution

Executions carried out in Arkansas
Preceded by Charles Fields January 24, 1964	John Edward Swindler; June 18, 1990	Succeeded by Ronald Gene Simmons June 25, 1990
Executions carried out in the United States
Preceded by Thomas Baal – Nevada June 3, 1990	John Edward Swindler – Arkansas; June 18, 1990	Succeeded by Ronald Gene Simmons – Arkansas June 25, 1990
