= Paediatric-use marketing authorisation =

Medicine marketing authorisation

Paediatric-use marketing authorisations (PUMA) are granted by the European Medicines Agency (EMA) for medical products that are intended exclusively for paediatric use, that is, for use in patients younger than 18 years. Like ordinary EMA marketing authorisations, a PUMA approval is valid in all countries of the European Economic Area (the European Union as well as Iceland, Liechtenstein, and Norway). The PUMA process was established to make it more profitable for pharmaceutical companies to market drugs for children. For this purpose, new data used for PUMA approved drugs are protected for 10 years, and the applications are partially exempt from fees.

In September 2011, the first drug was approved under this process. It was Buccolam, a buccal application form of midazolam for the treatment of seizures.
