= Murder of Stacy Errickson =

1994 kidnapping and murder of a woman in Jacksonville, Arkansas

Stacy Errickson
- Stacy Errickson
- Born: Stacy Rae Sullivan; December 15, 1971; Pulaski County, Arkansas, U.S.
- Died: November 20, 1994 (aged 22); North Little Rock, Arkansas, U.S.
- Resting place: Mulhearn Memorial Park Cemetery
- Occupation: Nurse technician
- Employer: Arkansas Pediatric Facility
- Known for: Victim of a kidnapping and murder case
- Children: 2

On November 20, 1994, 22-year-old nurse technician Stacy Rae Errickson (Note: Her name was also spelt as Stacey Errickson.) (December 15, 1971 – November 20, 1994), a mother of two young children, was abducted from a gas station in Jacksonville, Arkansas, near Little Rock. The kidnapper, Marcel Wayne Williams, forced Errickson to withdraw money from various ATMs before he raped and killed Errickson near the Arkansas River. Williams confessed to the crime when he was arrested nine days later for unrelated cases of rape, and he was thus charged with the kidnapping, rape, and murder of Errickson. Williams was convicted and sentenced to death on January 14, 1997, and he also received three life sentences plus 70 years for separate rape incidents he committed on two women. Williams was incarcerated on death row for about 20 years before he was executed on April 24, 2017.

== Kidnapping and murder ==
On the morning of November 20, 1994, 22-year-old nurse technician Stacy Rae Errickson, who had a son and daughter, was on her way to work when she stopped at a gas station near Little Rock in Jacksonville, Arkansas.

At approximately 6:45 a.m., 24-year-old Marcel Wayne Williams approached Errickson and threatened her at gunpoint. Williams forced Errickson into the front passenger seat of a car while he took the driver's seat and drove to several ATMs where he forced Errickson to withdraw money. A total of 18 transactions were made, and an amount of US$350 was yielded from the ATMs. Two witnesses saw the abduction of Errickson at the gas station, and they later identified Williams as the gunman responsible for the crime.

Williams subsequently took Errickson somewhere near the Arkansas River, where he raped and strangled her. He buried her body in a shallow grave near the murder scene and fled the area. Williams was arrested on November 29, nine days after the murder, due to outstanding charges of raping two women in unrelated cases. While undergoing questioning for these cases, Williams admitted kidnapping Errickson, but he denied murdering her, stating that she was still alive to the best of his knowledge. The police discovered Errickson's body on December 5, 1994, nearly a week after Williams confessed to her abduction. The police obtained forensic evidence to prove that Williams raped Errickson, and the autopsy results confirmed that Errickson died from strangulation.

On April 5, 1995, Pulaski County prosecutors charged Williams with murder, rape, aggravated robbery, and kidnapping.

== Perpetrator and legal process ==
=== Background ===
Mugshot of Marcel Williams

Born in North Little Rock, Arkansas on August 20, 1970, Marcel Wayne Williams, who never got to meet or know his biological father, grew up with three siblings. He was subjected to physical and psychological abuse by his mother and stepfather. Williams was held at the Pine Bluff Training School, a correctional facility for juveniles, after committing theft. When Williams was 15 years old, he was sentenced to a 20-year term in adult prison for one count of aggravated robbery and six counts of burglary. He was gang raped during his incarceration for the robbery case. After serving nine years behind bars, Williams was released on parole in April 1994. While out on parole, Williams kidnapped and raped at least two women before the murder of Errickson.

=== Trial and appeals ===
On January 6, 1997, Williams stood trial at the Pulaski County Circuit Court for the kidnapping, aggravated robbery, rape, and murder of Stacy Rae Errickson. Williams was subsequently found guilty on all counts, and the jury presiding his trial sentenced Williams to death for the most serious charge of murder on January 14, 1997. Prior to his trial, Williams was also given three life sentences plus 70 years for his other offenses of kidnapping and raping two other women.

Williams appealed against his conviction and sentence to the Supreme Court of Arkansas, but the Supreme Court rejected his appeal in 1999.

After exhausting his appeals against his conviction and sentence, Williams filed a post-conviction application, alleging that he had been subjected to inadequate legal representation during his trial. He argued his defense counsel failed to present mitigating factors, such as his childhood abuse and trauma, during the sentencing phase of his trial, and a new sentencing trial should be conducted to consider all the mitigating factors (in addition to the prior aggravating circumstances) before deciding on his sentence. Pulaski County Circuit Judge John Plegge denied the motion after hearing it, and in January 2002, the Arkansas Supreme Court rejected Williams's appeal against the decision of Plegge to dismiss his application.

In 2007, Williams made similar claims of ineffective legal representation and highlighted his former counsel's failure to present the mitigating circumstances of his troubled life when his case was brought before the federal courts. On April 11, 2007, Chief U.S. District Judge James Leon Holmes granted Williams a reprieve, finding there was sufficient weight in the mitigating evidence where the jury could have settled on a life sentence instead of death, and the trial lawyers had been constitutionally inadequate because of their failure to assist Williams in presenting these mitigating factors before the jury back in 1997. Holmes directed the state to either conduct a new sentencing hearing or commute Williams's death sentence to life imprisonment.

Subsequently, the state appealed to the 8th U.S. Circuit Court of Appeals against this decision. A three-judge panel reversed the ruling on August 18, 2009, after it ruled on procedural grounds that there was no prejudice against Williams through this failure to present the mitigating evidence. They noted that the trial counsel and Williams decided to admit guilt to the charges and to argue for a lighter penalty, and one of Williams's former lawyers had testified that they chose not to present the mitigating evidence of William's troubled past because neither Williams nor his mother would be a viable witness to these facts, and because it might potentially jeopardize and damage the cross-examination of Williams should the mitigating evidence be presented in court with an expert.

In 2010, Williams was a plaintiff in a lawsuit filed against the state pertaining to the lethal injection protocols of Arkansas's execution policies.

Eventually, a death warrant was issued for Williams, scheduling him to be put to death on July 12, 2011. A month before Williams's tentative execution date, a clemency hearing was conducted for Williams, and his lawyers asked the parole board to show him mercy and commute his death sentence on humanitarian grounds, specifically centering their plea on his troubled childhood. The seven-member representative panel of the parole board voted six to zero to dismiss the clemency plea (the seventh member abstained from voting). Ultimately, Williams's execution was postponed due to legal issues.

A second death warrant was issued in September 2015 for Williams, whose new execution date was fixed on December 14, 2015. This execution order was once again delayed in October 2015.

== Controversy and execution ==
=== Death warrant and controversies ===
In March 2017, Asa Hutchinson, the state governor of Arkansas, announced that a batch of eight death row prisoners in total would be executed in the following month of April. The spate of executions was scheduled to take place over ten days between April 17, and April 27, 2017, and a double execution would happen every three days within the 11-day period. Marcel Williams was one of the eight prisoners selected to be put to death during this time period, and his date of execution was scheduled for April 24, 2017, alongside serial killer Jack Harold Jones, who murdered at least three women in Florida and Arkansas between 1983 and 1995.

This decision was particularly controversial throughout the U.S. when it was first announced, given that it was unprecedented for a state to conduct a large number of executions within a short time frame and there were concerns that the rush to carry out the eight condemned's death sentences would not lead to due legal process and amounted to cruel and unusual punishment. A contributing factor was that the state's supply of midazolam, one of the three lethal injection drugs used by Arkansas for executing prisoners, was about to expire by the end of April 2017. It was argued that the state was rushing to execute Williams and the other seven inmates on the list before the drug expired, which further added to the opposition to the accelerated rate of impending executions in Arkansas. Arkansas defended its stance to arrange the executions, and the families of the victims, including Stacy Errickson (whom Williams murdered in 1994), supported the state's decision to move the executions forward.

Subsequently, four of the inmates on the list were spared the possibility of execution: one of them, Jason McGehee, who was found guilty of murdering his friend in 1996, was granted clemency and had his death sentence commuted to life in prison without the possibility of parole, while the other three – Don Williams Davis, Bruce Earl Ward, and Stacey Eugene Johnson – had their executions delayed due to pending lawsuits. However, the execution orders of Williams and the remaining three prisoners – Ledell Lee, Jack Harold Jones, and Kenneth Dewayne Williams – were not halted. Eventually, one of the inmates, Lee, was executed on April 21, 2017, thus ending the 12-year moratorium on state-level executions in Arkansas since 2005.

=== Clemency hearing and final appeals ===
On March 27, 2017, one month before his date of execution, a second clemency hearing was granted for Williams.

During the hearing, Williams expressed remorse for murdering Stacy Errickson back in 1994. Williams testified before a seven-member panel of the state parole board that he wished to beg for forgiveness and hoped his death sentence could be commuted to life without parole. He argued he could use his second chance to have a positive impact on other people throughout the rest of his life and that he had devoted himself to religion while on death row. The lawyers representing Williams in his clemency hearing implored the panel to grant their client clemency and temper justice with mercy, stating that Williams had a troubled childhood and his life was full of unspeakable trauma and torture, as corroborated by his siblings (including those fathered from his mother's second marriage), and he also pleaded guilty to the abduction and killing of Errickson. One of the surviving rape victims of Williams also testified in favor of Williams, stating that she forgave him for what he did to her many years ago.

On the other hand, the friends and family members of Errickson urged the parole board to not spare Williams's life and asked for his death sentence to be carried out. Errickson's mother stated that even though Errickson and her twin brother grew up in a fatherless environment just like Williams, neither Errickson nor her twin brother ended up turning to a life of crime and went to prison like Williams did. Trista Wussick, the babysitter of Errickson's two children, who was 12 at the time of the offense, stated that she would never forget the brutal end that came to Errickson and the impact it had on the lives of herself and both family and friends around her. One of the former prosecutors also argued that Williams should not be accorded the right to mercy, since he mercilessly deprived Errickson of the right to live and never showed any mercy when he abducted, raped, and murdered her back in 1994.

On March 30, 2017, by a majority decision of five to two, the parole board decided to not grant Williams clemency and confirmed his death sentence for murdering Errickson.

Throughout the final month before Williams would be executed, especially after the rejection of his clemency plea, his lawyers tried to help him to delay his execution, and the same efforts were made by other lawyers representing the batch of other prisoners slated for execution in April 2017 (except for Jason McGehee due to him receiving clemency). At one point, a stay of execution was obtained on April 14, from a district court for all the prisoners, but the stay order in the case of Williams and three of the other prisoners was overturned and allowed to move forward.

Williams also filed another appeal and claimed that his poor health and obesity (Williams weighed 400 pounds before his death) should prevent him from being executed as it might hinder the execution process. This appeal was also denied.

Barely an hour before Williams was executed, a last-minute stay of execution was imposed in light of witness accounts that Jack Harold Jones, the other inmate scheduled to die on the same day, gulped for air when the dose of midazolam was administered to him before he was pronounced dead, before the stay order was overturned by the same judge who halted Williams's execution. State authorities denied that Jones had gulped for air during the execution process.

=== Last meal and execution ===
On April 24, 2017, 46-year-old Marcel Wayne Williams was formally put to death via lethal injection at Cummins Unit, three hours after Jack Harold Jones was executed as scheduled, and this marked the first double execution in the U.S. in 17 years, after Texas last authorized a double execution in August 2000.

Jacob Rosenberg, a reporter for the Arkansas Times, was one of the witnesses of the execution, and he claimed that Williams was breathing heavily and his back was arched off the gurney several times when the drugs were administered one by one to him, and he was pronounced dead at 10.33p.m., nine minutes after he became motionless.

For his last meal, Williams ordered three fried chicken breasts, fried potato wedges and ketchup, nacho chips with chili and cheese sauce, jalapeños, ice cream, banana pudding, and two Mountain Dews.

Errickson's twin brother reportedly told the press in response to Williams's death sentence, "Justice has been served. It’s about time."

== Aftermath ==
Three days after Marcel Williams's death sentence was carried out, serial killer Kenneth Dewayne Williams became the fourth and final condemned prisoner to be executed in Arkansas on April 27, 2017. Since then, there have been no more inmates scheduled for execution in Arkansas as of 2026.

In response to the public backlash and criticisms against the accelerated rate of executions in Arkansas, state governor Asa Hutchinson stated that he "absolutely made the right decision" to ensure the law ran its course and fulfilled the ends of justice. Hutchinson, who made the statement a day after the execution of Kenneth Williams, stated that he was obliged by the law to order the death sentences to be carried out and brought a conclusion to the men's respective cases. He also noted that given his experience with back-to-back jury trials in the past, the compressed time frame was necessary at this point.

The case of Marcel Williams was adapted into an episode of the Life and Death Row documentary series by BBC Three in 2018.

On February 20, 2019, state representative Rebecca Petty (whose daughter was murdered by a relative) proposed a bill to set limitations on the death row last meal budgets, stating that death row prisoners should only order food catered to the general prison population for their last meal before their executions, and the last meal orders of Williams and three others put to death back in April 2017 was cited as one of the recent last meal orders Arkansas faced.

For the next nine years, the executions of both Marcel Williams and Jack Jones in Arkansas have remained the most recent instance of a U.S. death penalty state carrying out two executions on the same day. This record was broken on July 28, 2026, when Florida executed two convicted murderers – James Aren Duckett (Note: James Duckett, a former police officer, was sentenced to death for the 1987 rape and murder of 11-year-old Teresa McAbee. Duckett was initially set to be executed on March 31, 2026, but his execution was stayed a few days before the date due to post-conviction DNA testing matters, before the Florida Supreme Court overturned the stay four months later, leading to Governor Ron DeSantis to sign a new death warrant for Duckett.) and Dominick Occhicone (Note: Dominick Occhicone was convicted and sentenced to death for the 1986 murders of Martha and Raymond Artzner, his former girlfriend's parents. He was also the oldest prisoner to receive an execution date in Florida.) – on the same day by lethal injection.

== See also ==
- Capital punishment in Arkansas
- List of people executed in Arkansas
- List of people executed in the United States in 2017

Executions carried out in Arkansas
Preceded by Jack Harold Jones April 24, 2017	Marcel Williams; April 24, 2017	Succeeded by Kenneth Williams April 27, 2017
Executions carried out in the United States
Preceded by Jack Harold Jones – Arkansas April 24, 2017	Marcel Williams – Arkansas; April 24, 2017	Succeeded by Kenneth Williams – Arkansas April 27, 2017
