= Murder of Joshua Moyers =

2021 murder of a police officer in Florida

Joshua Moyers
- Born: Joshua Joseph Moyers; August 6, 1992; Florida, U.S.
- Died: September 23, 2021 (aged 29); Nassau County, Florida, U.S.
- Cause of death: Murder by shooting
- Occupation: Nassau County Sheriff's Deputy

On September 23, 2021, in Nassau County, Florida, 35-year-old ex-Marine Patrick Rene McDowell (born August 27, 1986) shot and mortally wounded 29-year-old Nassau County Sheriff's Deputy Joshua Joseph Moyers (August 6, 1992 – September 26, 2021) in midst of a traffic stop. Deputy Moyers died three days later of severe gunshot wounds. After the shooting, McDowell went on the run for five days before he was arrested and charged with the murder of Deputy Moyers. McDowell pleaded guilty to first-degree murder on March 10, 2023, and a year later, on July 17, 2024, McDowell was sentenced to death after the jury voted 11–1 for capital punishment. As of 2026, McDowell remains on death row awaiting his execution at the Union Correctional Institution.

== Murder ==
=== Background of victim ===
Nassau County Sheriff's Deputy Joshua Joseph Moyers was born on August 6, 1992, and he originated from Kings Ferry, Florida. Deputy Moyers completed his high school education in Hilliard Middle-Senior High School, before he further his studies in university, earning a bachelor's degree in Public Safety Management at Florida State College and also graduating from Saint Johns River State College in 2013. Deputy Moyers first joined the police force in 2011, first becoming a Sheriff's Office Explorer from early 2011 to May 2013, and later promoted to a deputy in 2015. On July 14, 2018, Deputy Moyers was awarded the Above and the Beyond the Call of Duty award for his investigation of a narcotics case.

=== Shooting and death ===
On the night of September 23, 2021, at around 11:45pm, while he was still on duty, Deputy Moyers stopped a moving van, which was driven by 35-year-old Patrick Rene McDowell, a former Marine. McDowell, who was accompanied by a female passenger, reportedly stated to the passenger that he did not want to go back to prison. At that time, McDowell was on drug-offender probation and also faced potential charges of felony misdemeanor in Georgia, which carried a possible sentence of up to 30 years in prison. Despite so, McDowell complied and stopped the van.

When Deputy Moyers approached the vehicle, McDowell gave the officer a false name due to the fact that he had outstanding warrants for his arrest for unrelated charges. Deputy Moyers asked McDowell to get out of the vehicle, and armed with his handgun, McDowell fired two shots at the police officer, first shooting Deputy Moyers in the face below his eye, before firing a second shot at Deputy Moyers's back as he fell to the ground. After the shooting, McDowell fled the scene.

Deputy Moyers, who was mortally wounded from the shooting, was rushed to the hospital, but the severity of his injuries were so much so that doctors predicted he will not survive. Deputy Moyers died at the age of 29 on September 26, 2021, three days after the shooting. After his death, Deputy Moyers's organs – liver, pancreas, both lungs and a kidney – were donated to five people, including an infant.

== Arrest and charges ==
After the murder of Deputy Joshua Moyers, Patrick McDowell was placed on the wanted list and more than 300 officers from multiple law enforcement agencies were deployed to conduct a manhunt for McDowell. Aside from this, the personal information and photos of McDowell were released to the public.

On September 28, 2021, the police finally traced the whereabouts of McDowell, and subsequently cornered into him at a concession stand next to Callahan Intermediate School. McDowell resisted arrest and engaged in a gunfight with the SWAT police officers, injuring a police dog in the process. McDowell himself was also shot multiple times and was therefore taken to the hospital for treatment, while at the same time placed under arrest for the murders.

After his arrest, McDowell was charged with first-degree murder for the killing of Deputy Moyers, and he was also charged with aggravated battery of a police dog.

On October 8, 2021, McDowell was formally indicted by a Nassau County grand jury for one count of first-degree murder, one count of injuring or killing a police dog and eight counts of aggravated assault on a law enforcement officer. State Attorney Melissa Nelson announced that she would seek the death penalty for McDowell.

On October 21, 2021, McDowell officially pleaded not guilty to the murder of Deputy Moyers.

Breiana Tole, a woman who helped McDowell to evade the authorities while he was at large for five days, was also arrested and charged as an accessory to murder. In June 2024, Tole was sentenced to three years in prison, followed by three years of probation. Since Tole's sentence was backdated to the date when she was first in custody, Tole, who had already served 980 days, would only need to continue serving a few months behind bars before her release.

== Patrick McDowell ==
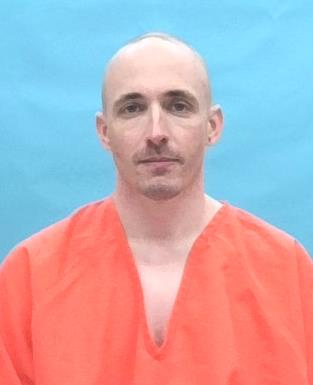
Patrick McDowell FDOC photo

Patrick Rene McDowell, a native of Harrisburg, Illinois, was born on August 27, 1986, and he lived in Jacksonville, Florida since 2011, and was also married at one point with a son. McDowell served in the U.S. Marine Corps and was deployed to Iraq. According to his father, McDowell was diagnosed with post-traumatic stress disorder and experienced depression and physical health issues. Despite his struggles, McDowell was described to be a good father to his son, who was 13 years old as of 2024, the year his father was sentenced for Moyers's murder.

Court records show McDowell had prior arrests in Duval County. In 2019, he was charged with possession of cocaine and drug paraphernalia and had an outstanding warrant related to uttering forged checks belonging to his grandfather. The drug charges were not prosecuted, and he later pleaded guilty to the uttering charge, receiving 18 months of drug-offender probation. His most recent arrest was April 27 for failure to appear in court. Nassau County records show no arrests there.

== Murder trial of McDowell ==
=== Plea of guilt ===
On March 10, 2023, Patrick McDowell pleaded guilty to the first-degree murder of Deputy Joshua Moyers, as well as eight counts of aggravated battery on a law enforcement officer and one count of use of a deadly weapon on a police K-9. Despite the plea of guilt, the death penalty remained on the table since the plea from McDowell did not carry the condition of removing it as a sentencing option.

=== Pre-sentencing hearings ===
Before the trial moved on to the sentencing phase, a hearing was conducted to determine whether to move the location of McDowell's trial to another location due to the pre-trial publicity surrounding the case, which potentially hampered the chances of choosing an impartial jury from Nassau County, where the murder of Deputy Moyers occurred. In March 2024, the trial judge James H. Daniel ruled that the trial venue should remain in Nassau County, because he found that the arguments for the proposed move were not convincing enough to show that McDowell would not be judged by an impartial jury as a result of the community's emotions invoked by the case's pre-trial publicity, and hence denied the defence's motion.

Aside from this, the defence also filed a motion to allow the jury to only impose the death penalty by a unanimous decision. At that time, the state of Florida had changed its laws to allow the death penalty be imposed by a majority vote from at least eight jurors or more, therefore invalidating the state's previous requirement for solely a unanimous recommendation for capital punishment. The new laws took effect in April 2023, a month after McDowell pleaded guilty to the murder of Deputy Moyers, and the defence asked for the law to not apply retroactively in McDowell's case. On April 4, 2024, Judge Daniels denied the defence's motion and ruled that the jury could decide to impose the death penalty via a non-unanimous vote.

=== Sentencing phase ===
During the sentencing trial, McDowell's family members, including his son and ex-wife, testified about McDowell's past and stated that his military experiences in Iraq affected him. The defence also called on two psychiatric experts, who testified that as a result of post-traumatic stress disorder, which was directly linked to his traumatic experiences during the military service, as well as his drug consumption, there was a substantial impairment of McDowell's mental responsibility at the time of the murder.

McDowell took the stand twice, and during the first time, he testified that he could never forgive himself for shooting Deputy Moyers and recounted how he shot the police officer in order to escape and stop himself from getting arrested. McDowell later took the stand a second time before the jury would decide on his sentence, and he addressed the court that he acknowledged the need for justice from Deputy Moyers's bereaved family and the community, and stated he felt sorry for what he did, and he acknowledged he was undeserving of mercy and he should "pay for it".

On April 25, 2024, by a majority vote of 11–1, the jury recommended the death penalty for McDowell, after it spent 3 1/2 hours to deliberate on sentence.

On July 17, 2024, Judge James H. Daniel sentenced McDowell to death for the murder of Deputy Joshua Moyers.

== Death row ==
As of 2026, Patrick McDowell remains incarcerated on death row at the Union Correctional Institution.

On October 8, 2025, McDowell officially filed an appeal to the Florida Supreme Court against his death sentence.

On July 16, 2026, the Florida Supreme Court rejected McDowell's appeal and upheld his conviction and sentence.

== Aftermath ==
In 2025, Life and Death Row, a true crime documentary series produced by BBC, featured the case of Deputy Joshua Moyers's murder and the trial of Patrick McDowell.

== See also ==
- Capital punishment in Florida
- List of death row inmates in the United States § Florida
