= List of people executed in Arkansas =

The following is a list of people executed by the U.S. state of Arkansas since 1976, when the Supreme Court reinstated the death penalty in the United States.

Arkansas has executed 31 people since 1976: 30 males and 1 female (Christina Marie Riggs). The first execution was carried out by electric chair; all subsequent executions were carried out by lethal injection. All were executed for the crime of murder. Another person, Daniel Eugene Remeta, was sentenced to death in Arkansas, but was executed in Florida in 1998 for another murder.

== List of people executed in Arkansas since 1976 ==
No.	Name	Race	Age	Sex	Date of execution	County	Method	Victim(s)	Governor
1	John Edward Swindler	White	46	M	June 18, 1990	Sebastian	Electrocution	Fort Smith police officer Randy Basnett (Note: Swindler was also convicted in South Carolina for killing Gregory Becknell and Dorothy Rhodes)	Bill Clinton
2	Ronald Gene Simmons Sr.	White	49	M	June 25, 1990	Pope	Lethal injection	16 murder victims (Note: The 16 victims were: Ronald Simmons Jr., Bersabe Simmons, Barbara Simmons, Loretta Simmons, Eddy Simmons, Marianne Simmons, Rebecca Simmons, William Simmons II, Renata Simmons, William Simmons III, Sheila McNulty, Dennis McNulty, Sylvia McNulty, Michael McNulty, Kathleen Kendrick, and James Chaffin.)	Bill Clinton
3	Rickey Ray Rector	Black	40	M	January 24, 1992	Faulkner	Lethal injection	Conway police officer Robert Martin	Bill Clinton
4	Steven Douglas Hill	White	26	M	May 7, 1992	Pulaski	Lethal injection	Arkansas State police officer Robert Klein	Bill Clinton
5	Jonas Hoten Whitmore	White	50	M	May 11, 1994	Montgomery	Lethal injection	Essie Mae Black	Jim Guy Tucker
6	Edward Charles Pickens	Black	39	M	May 11, 1994	Prairie	Lethal injection	Wesley Noble	Jim Guy Tucker
7	Hoyt Franklin Clines	White	37	M	August 3, 1994	Benton	Lethal injection	Donald Lehman	Jim Guy Tucker
8	Darryl V. Richley	White	43	M	August 3, 1994	Benton	Lethal injection	Donald Lehman	Jim Guy Tucker
9	James William Holmes	White	37	M	August 3, 1994	Benton	Lethal injection	Donald Lehman	Jim Guy Tucker
10	Richard Wayne Snell	White	64	M	April 19, 1995	Miller	Lethal injection	William Stumpp	Jim Guy Tucker
11	Barry Lee Fairchild	Black	41	M	August 31, 1995	Pulaski	Lethal injection	Marjorie Mason	Jim Guy Tucker
12	William Frank Parker	White	41	M	August 8, 1996	Benton	Lethal injection	James Warren and Sandra Warren	Mike Huckabee
13	Paul Ruiz	Hispanic	49	M	January 8, 1997	Logan	Lethal injection	Magazine Town Marshall Marvin Richie and Opal James (Note: Ruiz and Von Denton also killed four other people in Louisiana and Oklahoma.)	Mike Huckabee
14	Earl Von Denton	White	47	M	January 8, 1997	Logan	Lethal injection	Magazine Town Marshall Marvin Richie and Opal James	Mike Huckabee
15	Kirt Douglas Wainwright	Black	30	M	January 8, 1997	Nevada	Lethal injection	Barbara Smith	Mike Huckabee
16	Eugene Wallace Perry	White	53	M	August 6, 1997	Crawford	Lethal injection	Kenneth Staton and Suzanne Staton-Ware	Mike Huckabee
17	Wilburn A. Henderson	White	56	M	July 8, 1998	Sebastian	Lethal injection	Willa Dean O'Neal	Mike Huckabee
18	Johnie Michael Cox	White	42	M	February 16, 1999	White	Lethal injection	Marie Sullens, Margaret Brown, and Billy Brown	Mike Huckabee
19	Marion Albert Pruett	White	49	M	April 12, 1999	Sebastian	Lethal injection	Bobbie Jean Robertson (Note: Pruett also killed four other people in New Mexico, Mississippi and Colorado.)	Mike Huckabee
20	Mark Edward Gardner	White	43	M	September 8, 1999	Sebastian	Lethal injection	Joe Joyce, Martha Joyce, and Sara McCurdy	Mike Huckabee
21	Alan Willett	White	52	M	September 8, 1999	Johnson	Lethal injection	Eric Willett and Roger Willett	Mike Huckabee
22	Christina Marie Riggs	White	28	F	May 2, 2000	Pulaski	Lethal injection	Justin Riggs and Shelby Alexis Riggs	Mike Huckabee
23	David Dewayne Johnson	Black	37	M	December 19, 2000	Pulaski	Lethal injection	Leon Brown	Mike Huckabee
24	Clay King Smith	White	30	M	May 8, 2001	Jefferson	Lethal injection	5 murder victims (Note: The 5 victims were: Misty Erwin, Shelley Sorg, Sean Sorg, Taylor Sorg, and Samantha Rhodes.)	Mike Huckabee
25	Riley Dobi Noel	Black	31	M	July 9, 2003	Pulaski	Lethal injection	Marcell Young, Malak Hussian, and Mustafa Hussian	Mike Huckabee
26	Charles Laverne Singleton	Black	44	M	January 6, 2004	Ashley	Lethal injection	Mary Lou York	Mike Huckabee
27	Eric Randall Nance	White	45	M	November 28, 2005	Hot Spring	Lethal injection	Julie Heath	Mike Huckabee
28	Ledell T. Lee	Black	51	M	April 20, 2017	Pulaski	Lethal injection	Debra Reese	Asa Hutchinson
29	Jack Harold Jones Jr.	White	52	M	April 24, 2017	White	Lethal injection	Mary Phillips (Note: Jones also killed Regina Harrison and Lori Barrett in Florida.)	Asa Hutchinson
30	Marcel Wayne Williams	Black	46	M	April 24, 2017	Pulaski	Lethal injection	Stacy Rae Errickson	Asa Hutchinson
31	Kenneth Dewayne Williams	Black	38	M	April 27, 2017	Lincoln	Lethal injection	Cecil Boren (Note: Williams was previously convicted of murdering Dominique Hurd and Jerrell Jenkins.)	Asa Hutchinson

== Demographics ==
Race
White	20	65%
Black	10	32%
Hispanic	1	3%
Age
20–29	2	6%
30–39	8	26%
40–49	14	45%
50–59	6	19%
60–69	1	3%
Sex
Male	30	97%
Female	1	3%
Date of execution
1976–1979	0	0%
1980–1989	0	0%
1990–1999	21	68%
2000–2009	6	19%
2010–2019	4	13%
2020–2029	0	0%
Method
Lethal injection	30	97%
Electrocution	1	3%
Governor (Party)
David Pryor (D)	0	0%
Joe Purcell (D)	0	0%
Bill Clinton (D)	4	13%
Frank D. White (R)	0	0%
Jim Guy Tucker (D)	7	23%
Mike Huckabee (R)	16	52%
Mike Beebe (D)	0	0%
Asa Hutchinson (R)	4	13%
Sarah Huckabee Sanders (R)	0	0%
Total	31	100%

== See also ==
- Capital punishment in Arkansas
- Capital punishment in the United States
- List of people executed in Arkansas (pre-1972) — executions before Furman
