= Charles Laverne Singleton =

American murderer (1959–2004)

- Born: March 29, 1959; Hamburg, Arkansas, U.S.
- Died: January 6, 2004 (aged 44); Cummins Unit, Lincoln County, Arkansas, U.S.
- Status: Executed by lethal injection
- Conviction: Capital murder
- Penalty: Death

Details
- Victims: Mary Lou York, 19
- Date: June 1, 1979

Charles Laverne Singleton (March 29, 1959 – January 6, 2004) was an American convicted murderer, who, at the time of his execution, lived on death row in Arkansas longer than any other state inmate. He was executed in 2004 for the June 1, 1979, murder of 19-year-old Hamburg store owner Mary Lou York.

== Murder ==
Mary Lou York was attacked in York's Grocery Store, of which she was the owner. She died in the hospital from loss of blood as a result of two stab wounds in her neck.

The evidence of Singleton's guilt was overwhelming. Patti Franklin, who was a relative of Singleton, and Lenora Howard were both witnesses at the scene and identified him as having attacked York. Prior to her death, en route to the hospital, York also identified Singleton as her attacker. She told both police officer Strother, first to arrive at the scene, and her personal physician, Dr. J.D. Rankin, that she was dying and that Singleton did it. He was 20 years old at the time.

== Appeals ==
After his conviction and imprisonment, Singleton was diagnosed with schizophrenia. In 1986, the Supreme Court of the United States ruled in Ford v. Wainwright that execution of the mentally insane was unconstitutional, as they could not understand the reality of, or reason for, their punishment. It thus constituted "cruel and unusual punishment."

The death sentence for Singleton drew global attention because he was considered legally sane only when treated with medication. His attorney argued that the state could not alter Singleton's mental state with medication in order to make him sane enough to be executed.

Singleton's execution was scheduled five times. In Singleton's final appeal, the U.S. Supreme Court decided that he was taking his medication voluntarily and refused to overturn his sentence. In the end, Singleton asked his attorney not to do anything further to block his execution.

== Execution ==
Singleton was scheduled to be executed on July 28, 1993. However, a judge later stayed the execution due to questions over Singleton's competency.

After Singleton had spent 24 years in the appeal process due to his diagnosis of schizophrenia, Arkansas Attorney General Mike Beebe told Governor Mike Huckabee that Singleton has been taking antipsychotic drugs that made him sane enough to be executed. Beebe told Huckabee that Singleton has no appeals pending and that nothing should prevent Singleton from being executed.

Singleton's final words were written, not spoken, and included many religious references. A part of his final statement read, "I am Charles Singleton, anointed by God, Victor Ra Hakim". He also wrote, "The blind think I'm playing a game. They deny me, refusing me existence. But everybody takes the place of another. You have taught me what you want done — and I will not let you down. God bless."

After much public debate on the issue of clemency, the state executed Singleton by lethal injection at 8:02 p.m. at the Cummins Unit of the Arkansas Department of Corrections on Tuesday, January 6, 2004. Singleton was the 26th person executed by the state of Arkansas since Furman v. Georgia, after new capital punishment laws in Arkansas came into force on March 23, 1973.

== See also ==
- Capital punishment in Arkansas
- Capital punishment in the United States
- List of people executed in Arkansas
- List of people executed in the United States in 2004

Executions carried out in Arkansas
Preceded by Riley Dobi Noel July 9, 2003	Charles Singleton; January 6, 2004	Succeeded by Eric Nance November 28, 2005
Executions carried out in the United States
Preceded by Ynobe Matthews – Texas January 6, 2004	Charles Singleton – Arkansas; January 6, 2004	Succeeded by Raymond Rowsey – North Carolina January 9, 2004
