= Ledell Lee =

American death row inmate executed in Arkansas (1965–2017)

- Born: July 31, 1965; Blytheville, Arkansas, U.S.
- Died: April 20, 2017 (aged 51); Cummins Unit, Arkansas, U.S.
- Status: Executed by lethal injection
- Convictions: Capital murder Kidnapping (2 counts); Rape (2 counts); Robbery; Burglary; Theft
- Penalty: Death (October 16, 1995)

Details
- Victims: Christine Lewis, 22; Carolyn Johnson (alleged); Debra Reese, 26
- Span of crimes: November 1989 – February 9, 1993
- Imprisoned at: Varner Unit

Ledell Lee (July 31, 1965 – April 20, 2017) was an American convicted murderer, suspected serial killer, and serial rapist who was executed for the 1993 murder of his neighbor, Debra Reese. He was convicted in 1995, and the Arkansas Supreme Court affirmed the conviction in 1997, but numerous questions have been raised about the justice of his trial and post-conviction representation. Issues have included conflict of interest for the judge, inebriation of counsel, and ineffective defense counsel. A request to postpone the execution in order to test DNA on the murder weapon, was denied by a circuit judge. After Lee's execution, it was proven that the DNA on the murder weapon belonged to another person, an unknown male. The weapon was a tire iron which the victim's husband had given her as a form of protection.

The same test also "found moderate support" that blood found on Lee's left shoe had belonged to Reese. Other evidence against Lee at the time of his trial included the testimony of three eyewitnesses and that at 1:53 PM on the day of the murder, Lee paid a debt with a $100 bill at a Rent-A-Center. Of the three one hundred dollar bills that the Rent-A-Center received that day, one of the bills bore a serial number that was within two digits of serial numbers on bills that the victim's father had turned over to police.

DNA evidence linked Lee, who had recently been paroled for burglary and theft, to three other attacks, including the 1989 abduction, rape, and murder of Christine Lewis. Lee was tried for Lewis's murder in 1994, but a mistrial was declared after it was discovered that one of the jurors was convicted felon who was related to Lee. Lee was never retried for Lewis's murder after being sentenced to death for the murder of Reese, but was sentenced to life in prison plus 150 years for two separate rapes. Lee was convicted of the 1990 kidnapping and rape of a 17-year-old girl whom he left for dead after trying to drown her in a river, and the 1991 kidnapping, rape, and robbery of a 50-year-old woman.

Lee is also suspected in the 1989 rape of a 70-year-old woman, whom he allegedly left for dead, as well as the 1991 murder of Carolyn Jackson, a sex worker who was last seen with him.

== Convictions ==
Debra Kay Reese (September 27, 1966 – February 9, 1993), age 26 years, was found dead in 1993 in her home in Jacksonville, Arkansas. She had been strangled and beaten with a small wooden bat her husband had given her for protection.

Several of Reese's neighbors said they saw Lee near the house and identified him to police. He was arrested less than an hour later, allegedly after spending some of the $300 stolen from Reese.

Lee was charged with first degree murder, a capital offense. He was alleged to have struck Debra Reese 36 times with a tire thumper. He was convicted of capital murder by the jury and sentenced to death on October 16, 1995.

=== Post-arrest rape convictions, prosecution, and suspected crimes ===
After being charged in the murder of Reese, Lee became a suspect in other crimes. He was accused of three sexual assaults and convicted of two, the 1991 rape of a Jacksonville woman and the 1990 rape of a Jacksonville teenager.

Lee was also prosecuted for the November 1989 rape and murder of 22-year-old Christine Lewis, a mother, in November 1989. Lewis was abducted from her home. She was later raped, strangled, and eventually killed. Her body was found inside a closet at an abandoned home. Lee was tried in 1994, but a mistrial was declared after it was discovered that one of the jurors was convicted felon who was related to Lee. After Lee was convicted and sentenced to death for Reese's murder, county prosecutors decided against retrying him for the alleged murder of Lewis.

On September 21, 1995, Lee was convicted of the kidnapping and rape of a 17-year-old girl in Jacksonville, Arkansas on November 27, 1990. The victim testified that she was home alone with her three-year-old nephew and three-month-old niece on the evening of the assault. She stated that while she was rocking her niece, Lee came up behind her, put an arm around her neck, struck her on the head and face with an iron, forced her out of the house and into a wooded area, where he raped her, choked her, then held her head under water in a ditch until she lost consciousness. She testified that when she regained consciousness, she was lying face up in the ditch, wearing only a bra and a tee shirt. She returned home and was taken to a hospital emergency room where the rape examination was performed. The victim described her attacker as a tall, black man with large hands. The FBI agent who performed the DNA analysis concluded that the probability of the assailant being someone other than Lee was one in 83 million from the black population. Lee received a 60-year sentence in this case.

On October 19, 1995, Lee was convicted of the kidnapping, rape, and robbery of a 50-year-old woman on March 7, 1991. That evening, the victim returning home from the grocery store when she noticed Lee following her. When she stepped off the sidewalk to let Lee pass, he grabbed her around the neck and began strangling her, causing her to drop her groceries. Lee began rummaging through her purse in an attempt to find money. Warning the victim to remain silent if she wanted to live, Lee then dragged her to the back of the school building. When the woman attempted to cry out for help, Lee strangled her to the point of near-unconsciousness, then removed the victim's belt and bound her hands with it. After dumping out the contents of her purse, Lee found an apron that he used to cover her face. He then removed her clothes and demanded oral sex. When woman refused, he raped her and left her with her hands still bound and her face still blindfolded. Lee was sentenced to life in prison plus 150 years in this case.

Lee's prior convictions were cited by the prosecution at the sentencing phase of his capital murder trial. The judge described him as a "hunter" whose "prey were the people of Jacksonville from 1990 to 1993."

Lee is also a suspect in the 1991 murder of Carolyn Johnson, a black sex worker who was last seen talking with him in 1991.

=== Death row ===
Lee was placed on death row in 1995. During most of that time, he was kept in solitary confinement, with extremely limited social contact. This is customary for death row prisoners. Lee was interviewed by the BBC before his execution. He said, "My dying words will always be, as it has been: I am an innocent man".

== Appeals ==
Lee maintained his innocence until the time of his death. Before he was executed, Lee was working with his lawyers at the Innocence Project and ACLU to conduct DNA analysis on blood and hair evidence collected from the 1993 crime scene. It had never been previously tested in the case. The state of Arkansas denied the defense request to have the analysis done. Lee's counsel had argued that they should be allowed to locate crime scene evidence collected in 1993, including a single hair and a Converse shoe with a pinhead-sized spot of human blood on it, for modern DNA testing. They hoped testing could prove that another man had been at the crime scene, and that evidence did not match Lee's DNA.

=== Motions ===
Lee had also filed a motion in federal court asking the court to reopen his federal case due to issues with his first counsel, particularly the failure of counsel to bring evidence of his intellectual disability. Lee wanted to present new evidence showing that he had fetal alcohol syndrome disorder, significant brain damage, and intellectual disability. Lee's family worked with him and his lawyers to try to prove his innocence. During the hearing, Lee's attorney Lee Short made the case that prior counsel in the Reese case failed Lee by not insisting on modern DNA testing of the items prior to that time. He said that Lee had contacted the Innocence Project in 1996, asking for them to take up his case, but was told they did not have the staff or funding.

=== Controversy over judge's conflict of interest ===
According to the ACLU:

Additionally, Lee was tried by a judge who concealed his own conflict of interest: an affair with the assistant prosecutor, to whom the judge was later married. Mr. Lee's first state post-conviction counsel introduced the evidence of the affair by calling the judge's ex-wife, who testified about the affair after opposing the subpoena. That lawyer, however, was so intoxicated at the hearing that the state moved for him to be drug tested after he slurred, stumbled, and made incoherent arguments. The inebriated lawyer also represented Lee briefly in federal court, where he raised the important claim that Lee was ineligible for execution because of intellectual disability. Lee won new proceedings because of the lawyer's drunkenness, though his representation did not improve afterward. His next lawyers failed to introduce evidence of the affair, giving up one of many of Lee's important arguments, and never pursued his innocence or intellectual disability claims.

"This is a story of the judicial process gone totally wrong," Lee's lawyer said. "The kinds of attorney failures here: an affair with the presiding judge by the prosecutor, gross intoxication by defense counsel, and wild incompetence undermine our profession as a whole. Mr. Lee has never had the opportunity to have his case truly investigated, despite serious questions about guilt, and his intellectual disability."

Throughout the legal challenges, the family of Debra Reese hoped that the execution would go through as scheduled.

== Execution ==
Lee was the first person executed in Arkansas since Eric Nance was executed in November 2005. The years of suspension have been related to court challenges to the use of lethal injections, with opponents arguing this form violated the Constitution. In addition, Europe has prohibited export of one of the drugs needed for this method.

For his last meal, Lee chose to receive Holy Communion. He had no last words.

At 11:44 p.m., Lee was given the lethal injection. His eyes closed three minutes later and he did not appear to show signs of discomfort, according to Sean Murphy, a reporter with the Associated Press and one of three media witnesses.

=== Lethal injection controversy in Arkansas ===
In April 2017, Arkansas planned to execute eight death row inmates including Ledell Lee, along with Don W. Davis, Stacey Johnson, Jack Harold Jones, Jason McGehee, Bruce Earl Ward, Kenneth Williams, and Marcel Williams, before the stocks of the sedative midazolam expired at the end of April. Because Europe has prohibited export of these drugs to the United States and the major manufacturer is there, states in the US have been struggling with supplies.

A federal judge initially issued an injunction preventing the executions, but the Arkansas Supreme Court overturned the ruling. The United States Supreme Court rejected a claim that the accelerated execution schedule was "cruel and unusual punishment" under the constitution. At one point in the evening of April 20, 2017, the United States Supreme Court briefly delayed the execution as it reviewed appeals. It voted 5–4 to allow the state to proceed with the execution. On April 20, 2017, at about 11:30 p.m. CDT, the state of Arkansas was allowed to proceed with Lee's execution.

In his first vote since being appointed to the US Supreme Court, Justice Neil Gorsuch voted in favor of the execution. At 11:56 p.m. CDT, four minutes prior to the expiration of his execution warrant, Ledell Lee was executed. About 30 minutes after the high court's ruling, Lee was pronounced dead.

"The governor knows the right thing was done tonight," said J.R. Davis, a spokesman for Arkansas Governor Asa Hutchinson, who scheduled the multiple executions. "Justice was carried out." The state has proceeded with executions in order to avoid the expiration of drugs used in lethal injections. On April 24, 2017, the state executed Jack Harold Jones and Marcel Williams, in the first double execution in the United States in 17 years.

== Post-execution DNA testing ==
In April 2021, new DNA testing found "unknown male" DNA on the murder weapon and bloody clothes found at the scene. However, the test also "found moderate support" that blood on Lee's left shoe could have belonged to Reese.

== See also ==
- Capital punishment in Arkansas
- List of people executed in Arkansas
- List of people executed in the United States in 2017

Executions carried out in Arkansas
Preceded by Eric Nance November 28, 2005	Ledell Lee; April 20, 2017	Succeeded by Jack Harold Jones April 24, 2017
Executions carried out in the United States
Preceded by James Bigby – Texas March 14, 2017	Ledell Lee – Arkansas; April 20, 2017	Succeeded by Jack Harold Jones – Arkansas April 24, 2017
