= Midazolam =

Benzodiazepine used for anesthesia and procedural sedation

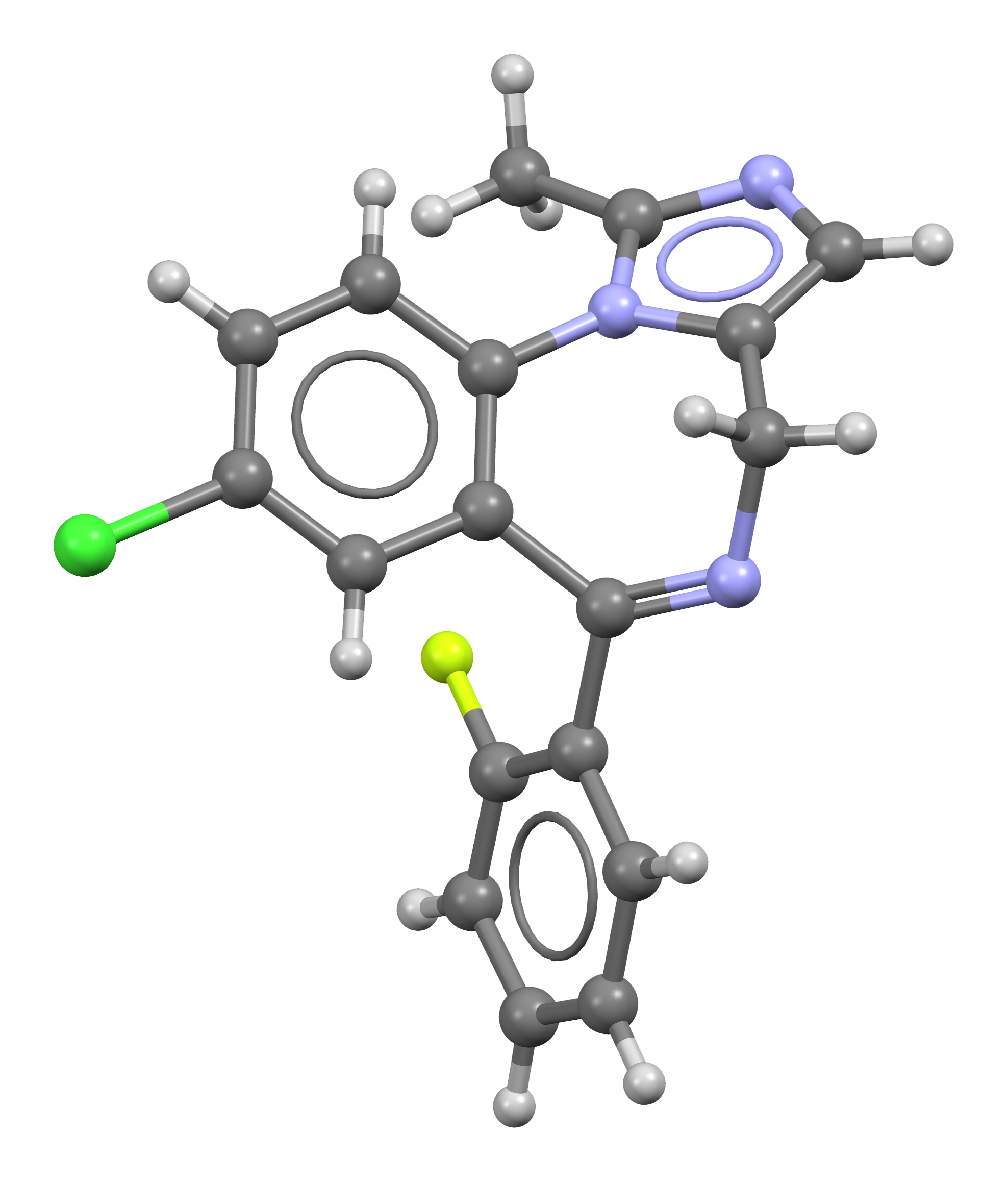

Clinical data
- Pronunciation: /mɪˈdæzəlæm/
- Trade names: Versed, others
- AHFS/Drugs.com: Monograph
- MedlinePlus: a609003
- License data: US DailyMed: Midazolam
- Pregnancy category: AU: C
- Addiction liability: Moderate
- Routes of administration: By mouth, intramuscular, intravenous, buccal, intranasal
- Drug class: Benzodiazepine
- ATC code: N05CD08 (WHO)

Legal status
- Legal status: AU: S4 (Prescription only); BR: Class B1 (Psychoactive drugs); CA: Schedule IV; DE: Prescription only (Anlage III for higher doses); NZ: Class C; UK: POM (Prescription only); US: Schedule IV; EU: Rx-only; SE: Förteckning IV In general: ℞ (Prescription only)

Pharmacokinetic data
- Bioavailability: By mouth: variable, around 40% Intramuscular: ≥90%
- Protein binding: 97%
- Metabolism: Liver: CYP3A3, CYP3A4, CYP3A5
- Onset of action: Within 5 min (IV), 15 min (IM), 20 min (oral)
- Elimination half-life: 1.5–2.5 hours
- Duration of action: 1–6 hours
- Excretion: Kidney

Identifiers
- IUPAC name: 8-chloro-6-(2-fluorophenyl)-1-methyl-4H-imidazo[1,5-a][1,4]benzodiazepine
- CAS Number: 59467-70-8
- PubChem CID: 4192
- IUPHAR/BPS: 3342
- DrugBank: DB00683
- ChemSpider: 4047
- UNII: R60L0SM5BC
- KEGG: D00550; as HCl: D00696
- ChEBI: CHEBI:6931
- ChEMBL: ChEMBL655
- CompTox Dashboard (EPA): DTXSID5023320
- ECHA InfoCard: 100.056.140

Chemical and physical data
- Formula: C_{18}H_{13}ClFN_{3}
- Molar mass: 325.77 g·mol^{−1}
- 3D model (JSmol): Interactive image
- SMILES: ClC1=CC=C2C(C(C3=CC=CC=C3F)=NCC4=CN=C(C)N42)=C1
- InChI: InChI=1S/C18H13ClFN3/c1-11-21-9-13-10-22-18(14-4-2-3-5-16(14)20)15-8-12(19)6-7-17(15)23(11)13/h2-9H,10H2,1H3; Key:DDLIGBOFAVUZHB-UHFFFAOYSA-N

Midazolam, sold under the brand name Versed among others, is a benzodiazepine medication used for anesthesia, premedication before surgical anesthesia, and procedural sedation, and to treat severe agitation. It induces sleepiness, decreases anxiety, and causes anterograde amnesia.

The drug does not cause an individual to become unconscious, merely to be sedated. It is also useful for the treatment of prolonged (lasting over five minutes) seizures. Midazolam can be given by mouth, intravenously, by injection into a muscle, by spraying into the nose, or through the cheek. When given intravenously, it typically begins working within five minutes; when injected into a muscle, it can take fifteen minutes to begin working; when taken orally, it can take 10–20 minutes to begin working.

Side effects can include a decrease in efforts to breathe, low blood pressure, and sleepiness. Tolerance to its effects and withdrawal syndrome may occur following long-term use. Paradoxical effects, such as increased activity, can occur especially in children and older people. There is evidence of risk when used during pregnancy but no evidence of harm with a single dose during breastfeeding.

Midazolam was patented in 1974 and came into medical use in 1982. It is on the World Health Organization's List of Essential Medicines. Midazolam is available as a generic medication. In many countries, it is a controlled substance.

== Medical uses ==
=== Seizures ===
Midazolam is sometimes used for the acute management of prolonged seizures. Long-term use for the management of epilepsy is not recommended due to the significant risk of tolerance (which makes midazolam and other benzodiazepines ineffective) and the significant side effect of sedation. A benefit of midazolam is that in children it can be given in the cheek or in the nose for acute seizures, including status epilepticus.

Drawbacks include a high degree of breakthrough seizures—due to the short half-life of midazolam—in over 50% of people treated, as well as treatment failure in 14–18% of people with refractory status epilepticus. Tolerance develops rapidly to the anticonvulsant effect, and the dose may need to be increased by several times to maintain anticonvulsant therapeutic effects. With prolonged use, tolerance and tachyphylaxis can occur and the elimination half-life may increase, up to days. Buccal and intranasal midazolam may be both easier to administer and more effective than rectally administered diazepam in the emergency control of seizures.

=== Procedural sedation ===
Intravenous midazolam is indicated for procedural sedation (often in combination with an opioid, such as fentanyl), preoperative sedation, for the induction of general anesthesia, and for sedation of people who are ventilated in critical care units. Midazolam is superior to diazepam in impairing memory of endoscopy procedures, but propofol has a quicker recovery time and a better memory-impairing effect. It is the most popular benzodiazepine in the intensive care unit (ICU) because of its short elimination half-life, combined with its water solubility and its suitability for continuous infusion. However, for long-term sedation, lorazepam is preferred due to its long duration of action, and propofol has advantages over midazolam when used in the ICU for sedation, such as shorter weaning time and earlier tracheal extubation.

Midazolam is sometimes used in neonatal intensive care units. When used, additional caution is required in newborns; midazolam should not be used for longer than 72 hours due to risks of tachyphylaxis, and the possibility of development of a benzodiazepine withdrawal syndrome, as well as neurological complications. Bolus injections should be avoided due to the increased risk of cardiovascular depression, as well as neurological complications.

Sedation using midazolam can be used to relieve anxiety and manage behaviour in children undergoing dental treatment.

=== Agitation ===
Midazolam, in combination with an antipsychotic drug, is indicated for the acute management of schizophrenia when it is associated with aggressive or out-of-control behaviour.

=== End-of-life care ===
In the final stages of end-of-life care, midazolam is routinely used at low doses via subcutaneous injection to help with agitation, restlessness, or anxiety in the last hours or days of life. Midazolam is considered a first-line agent in palliative continuous deep sedation therapy—when it is necessary to alleviate intolerable suffering not responsive to other treatments, but the need for higher doses is rare.

== Contraindications ==
Benzodiazepines require special precaution if used in the elderly, during pregnancy, in children, in alcohol- or other drug-dependent individuals or those with comorbid psychiatric disorders. Additional caution is required in critically ill patients, as accumulation of midazolam and its active metabolites may occur. Kidney or liver impairments may slow down the elimination of midazolam leading to prolonged and enhanced effects.

== Side effects ==
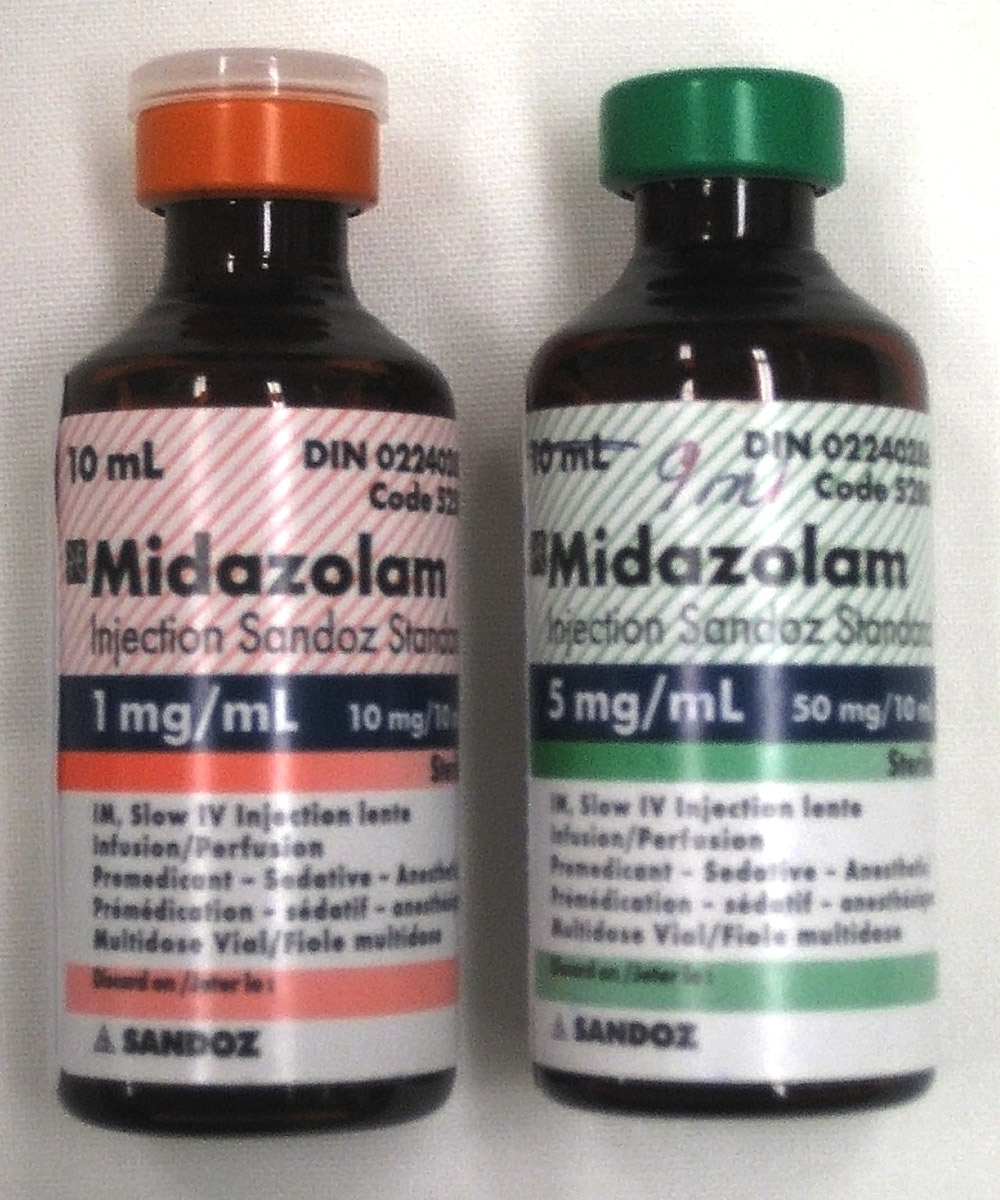
Injectable midazolam in 1 and 5 mg/ml strengths

Side effects of midazolam in the elderly are listed above. People experiencing amnesia as a side effect of midazolam are generally unaware their memory is impaired, unless they had previously known it as a side effect.

Long-term use of benzodiazepines has been associated with long-lasting deficits in memory, and show only partial recovery six months after stopping benzodiazepines. It is unclear whether full recovery occurs after longer periods of abstinence. Benzodiazepines can cause or worsen depression. Paradoxical excitement occasionally occurs with benzodiazepines, including a worsening of seizures. Children and elderly individuals or those with a history of excessive alcohol use and individuals with a history of aggressive behavior or anger are at increased risk of paradoxical effects. Paradoxical reactions are particularly associated with intravenous administration. After nighttime administration of midazolam, residual 'hangover' effects, such as sleepiness and impaired psychomotor and cognitive functions, may persist into the next day. This may impair the ability of users to drive safely and may increase the risk of falls and hip fractures. Sedation, respiratory depression and hypotension due to a reduction in systematic vascular resistance, and an increase in heart rate can occur. If intravenous midazolam is given too quickly, hypotension may occur. A "midazolam infusion syndrome" may result from high doses, is characterised by delayed arousal hours to days after discontinuation of midazolam, and may lead to an increase in the length of ventilatory support needed.

In rare susceptible individuals, midazolam has been known to cause a paradoxical reaction, a well-documented complication with benzodiazepines. When this occurs, the individual may experience anxiety, involuntary movements, aggressive or violent behavior, uncontrollable crying or verbalization, and other similar effects. This seems to be related to the altered state of consciousness or disinhibition produced by the drug. Paradoxical behavior is often not recalled by the patient due to the amnesia-producing properties of the drug. In extreme situations, flumazenil can be administered to inhibit or reverse the effects of midazolam. Antipsychotic medications, such as haloperidol, have also been used for this purpose.

Midazolam is known to cause respiratory depression. In healthy humans, 0.15 mg/kg of midazolam may cause respiratory depression, which is postulated to be a central nervous system (CNS) effect. When midazolam is administered in combination with fentanyl, the incidence of hypoxemia or apnea becomes more likely.

Although the incidence of respiratory depression/arrest is low (0.1–0.5%) when midazolam is administered alone at normal doses, the concomitant use with CNS acting drugs, mainly analgesic opiates, may increase the possibility of hypotension, respiratory depression, respiratory arrest, and death, even at therapeutic doses. Potential drug interactions involving at least one CNS depressant were observed for 84% of midazolam users who were subsequently required to receive the benzodiazepine antagonist flumazenil. Therefore, efforts directed toward monitoring drug interactions and preventing injuries from midazolam administration are expected to have a substantial impact on the safe use of this drug.

=== Pregnancy and breastfeeding ===
Midazolam, when taken during the third trimester of pregnancy, may cause risk to the neonate, including benzodiazepine withdrawal syndrome, with possible symptoms including hypotonia, apnoeic spells, cyanosis, and impaired metabolic responses to cold stress. Symptoms of hypotonia and the neonatal benzodiazepine withdrawal syndrome have been reported to persist from hours to months after birth. Other neonatal withdrawal symptoms include hyperexcitability, tremor, and gastrointestinal upset (diarrhea or vomiting). Breastfeeding by mothers using midazolam is not recommended.

=== Elderly ===
Additional caution is required in the elderly, as they are more sensitive to the pharmacological effects of benzodiazepines, metabolise them more slowly, and are more prone to adverse effects, including drowsiness, amnesia (especially anterograde amnesia), ataxia, hangover effects, confusion, and falls.

=== Tolerance, dependence, and withdrawal ===
A benzodiazepine dependence occurs in about one-third of individuals who are treated with benzodiazepines for longer than 4 weeks, which typically results in tolerance and benzodiazepine withdrawal syndrome when the dose is reduced too rapidly. Midazolam infusions may induce tolerance and a withdrawal syndrome in a matter of days. The risk factors for dependence include dependent personality, use of a benzodiazepine that is short-acting, high potency and long-term use of benzodiazepines. Withdrawal symptoms from midazolam can range from insomnia and anxiety to seizures and psychosis. Withdrawal symptoms can sometimes resemble a person's underlying condition. Gradual reduction of midazolam after regular use can minimise withdrawal and rebound effects. Tolerance and the resultant withdrawal syndrome may be due to receptor down-regulation and GABA_{A} receptor alterations in gene expression, which causes long-term changes in the function of the GABAergic neuronal system.

Chronic users of benzodiazepine medication who are given midazolam experience reduced therapeutic effects of midazolam, due to tolerance to benzodiazepines. Prolonged infusions with midazolam results in the development of tolerance; if midazolam is given for a few days or more a withdrawal syndrome can occur. Therefore, preventing a withdrawal syndrome requires that a prolonged infusion be gradually withdrawn, and sometimes, continued tapering of dose with an oral long-acting benzodiazepine such as clorazepate dipotassium. When signs of tolerance to midazolam occur during intensive care unit sedation the addition of an opioid or propofol is recommended. Withdrawal symptoms can include irritability, abnormal reflexes, tremors, clonus, hypertonicity, delirium and seizures, nausea, vomiting, diarrhea, tachycardia, hypertension, and tachypnea.

=== Overdose ===
A midazolam overdose is considered a medical emergency and generally requires the immediate attention of medical personnel. Benzodiazepine overdose in healthy individuals is rarely life-threatening with proper medical support; however, the toxicity of benzodiazepines increases when they are combined with other CNS depressants such as alcohol, opioids, or tricyclic antidepressants. The toxicity of benzodiazepine overdose and the risk of death are also increased in the elderly and those with obstructive pulmonary disease or when used intravenously. Treatment is supportive; activated charcoal can be used within an hour of the overdose. The antidote for an overdose of midazolam (or any other benzodiazepine) is flumazenil. While effective in reversing the effects of benzodiazepines it is not used in most cases as it may trigger seizures in mixed overdoses and benzodiazepine dependent individuals.

Symptoms of midazolam overdose can include:

- Ataxia
- Dysarthria
- Nystagmus
- Slurred speech
- Somnolence (difficulty staying awake)
- Mental confusion
- Hypotension
- Respiratory arrest
- Vasomotor collapse
- Impaired motor functions
  - Impaired reflexes
  - Impaired coordination
  - Impaired balance
  - Dizziness
- Coma
- Death

=== Detection in body fluids ===
Concentrations of midazolam or its major metabolite, 1-hydroxymidazolam glucuronide, may be measured in plasma, serum, or whole blood to monitor for safety in those receiving the drug therapeutically, to confirm a diagnosis of poisoning in hospitalized patients, or to assist in a forensic investigation of a case of fatal overdosage. Patients with renal dysfunction may exhibit prolongation of elimination half-life for both the parent drug and its active metabolite, with accumulation of these two substances in the bloodstream and the appearance of adverse depressant effects.

== Interactions ==
Protease inhibitors, nefazodone, sertraline, grapefruit, fluoxetine, erythromycin, diltiazem, and clarithromycin inhibit the metabolism of midazolam, leading to a prolonged action. St John's wort, rifapentine, rifampin, rifabutin, and phenytoin enhance the metabolism of midazolam leading to a reduced action. Sedating antidepressants, antiepileptic drugs (e.g., phenobarbital, phenytoin, and carbamazepine), first-generation antihistamines, opioids, antipsychotics, and alcohol enhance the sedative effects of midazolam. Midazolam is metabolized almost completely by cytochrome P450-3A4. Atorvastatin administration along with midazolam results in a reduced elimination rate of midazolam. St John's wort decreases the blood levels of midazolam. Grapefruit juice reduces intestinal 3A4 and results in less metabolism and higher plasma concentrations.

== Pharmacology ==
Midazolam is a short-acting benzodiazepine in adults with an elimination half-life of 1.5–2.5 hours. In the elderly, as well as young children and adolescents, the elimination half-life is longer. Midazolam is metabolised into an active metabolite alpha-hydroxymidazolam. Age-related deficits, renal and liver status affect the pharmacokinetic factors of midazolam as well as its active metabolite. However, the active metabolite of midazolam is minor and contributes to only 10% of biological activity of midazolam. Midazolam is poorly absorbed orally, with only 50% of the drug reaching the bloodstream. Midazolam is metabolised by cytochrome P450 (CYP) enzymes and by glucuronide conjugation. Oxidation of midazolam is the major metabolite in human liver microsome (HLM). The half-life (t_{1/2}) of midazolam in HLM is 3.3 minutes. The therapeutic as well as adverse effects of midazolam are due to its effects on the GABA_{A} receptors; midazolam does not activate GABA_{A} receptors directly but, as with other benzodiazepines, it enhances the effect of the endogenous neurotransmitter GABA on the GABA_{A} receptors (increasing the frequency of Cl^{−} channel opening) resulting in neural inhibition. Almost all of the properties can be explained by the actions of benzodiazepines on GABA_{A} receptors. This results in the following pharmacological properties being produced: sedation, induction of sleep, reduction in anxiety, anterograde amnesia, muscle relaxation and anticonvulsant effects.

== History ==
Midazolam is among about 35 benzodiazepines currently used medically, and was synthesized in 1975 by Walser and Fryer at Hoffmann-LaRoche, Inc in the United States. Owing to its water solubility, it was found to be less likely to cause thrombophlebitis than similar drugs. The anticonvulsant properties of midazolam were studied in the late 1970s, but not until the 1990s did it emerge as an effective treatment for convulsive status epilepticus. As of 2010, it is the most commonly used benzodiazepine in anesthetic medicine. In acute medicine, midazolam has become more popular than other benzodiazepines, such as lorazepam and diazepam, because it is shorter lasting, is more potent, and causes less pain at the injection site. Midazolam is also becoming increasingly popular in veterinary medicine due to its water solubility. In 2018 it was revealed the CIA considered using midazolam as a "truth serum" on terrorist suspects in project "Medication".

== Society and culture ==
=== Cost ===
Midazolam is available as a generic medication.

=== Availability ===
Midazolam is available in the United States as a syrup or as an injectable solution.

Dormicum brand midazolam is marketed by Roche as white, oval, 7.5 mg tablets in boxes of two or three blister strips of 10 tablets, and as blue, oval, 15 mg tablets in boxes of two (Dormonid 3x) blister strips of 10 tablets. The tablets are imprinted with "Roche" on one side and the dose of the tablet on the other side. Dormicum is also available as 1, 3, and 10 mL ampoules at a concentration of 5 mg/mL. Another manufacturer, Novell Pharmaceutical Laboratories, makes it available as Miloz in 3 and 5 mL ampoules. Midazolam is the only water-soluble benzodiazepine available. Another maker is Roxane Laboratories; the product in an oral solution, midazolam HCl Syrup, 2 mg/mL clear, in a red to purplish-red syrup, cherry in flavor. It becomes soluble when the injectable solution is buffered to a pH of 2.9–3.7. Midazolam is also available in liquid form. It can be administered intramuscularly, intravenously, intrathecally, intranasally, buccally, or orally.

=== Legal status ===
In the Netherlands, midazolam is a List II drug of the Opium Law. Midazolam is a Schedule IV drug under the Convention on Psychotropic Substances. In the United Kingdom, midazolam is a Schedule 3/Class C controlled drug. In the United States, midazolam (DEA number 2884) is on the Schedule IV list of the Controlled Substances Act as a non-narcotic agent with low potential for abuse.

=== Marketing authorization ===
In 2011, the European Medicines Agency (EMA) granted a marketing authorisation for a buccal application form of midazolam, sold under the brand name Buccolam. Buccolam was initially approved for the treatment of prolonged, acute, convulsive seizures in people from three months to less than 18 years of age. This is the first application of a paediatric-use marketing authorisation by the EMA.

=== Use in executions ===
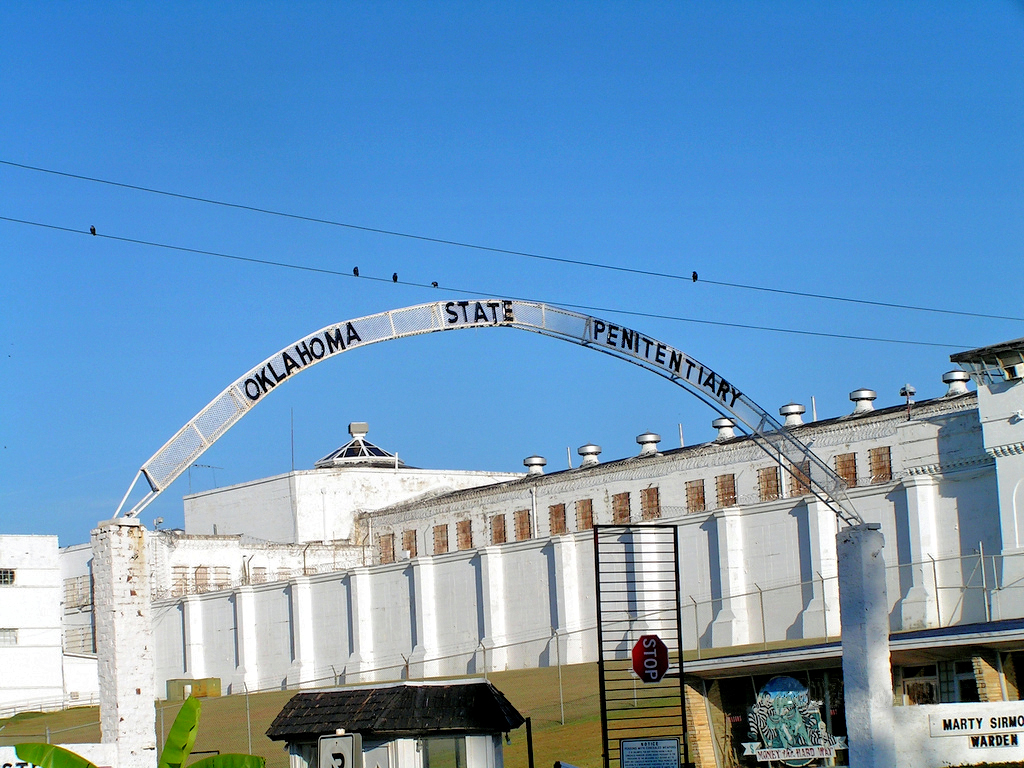
Oklahoma State Penitentiary, the site of the state of Oklahoma's execution chamber

The drug has been introduced for use in executions by lethal injection in certain jurisdictions in the United States in combination with other drugs. It was introduced to replace pentobarbital after the latter's manufacturer disallowed that drug's use for executions. Midazolam acts as a sedative, resulting in the prisoner being in a state of deep anesthesia comparable to that experienced during surgery. One or more other drugs are usually used to stop the prisoner's heart, rendering them medically dead.

Midazolam has been used as part of a three-drug cocktail with vecuronium bromide and potassium chloride in Florida and Oklahoma prisons and has also been used along with hydromorphone in a two-drug protocol in Ohio and Arizona.

==== Notable incidents ====
The state of Florida used midazolam to execute William Frederick Happ in October 2013.

The state of Ohio used midazolam in the execution of Dennis McGuire in January 2014; he was heavily anesthetized and unconscious within 4 minutes of starting the administration of midazolam and 20 more minutes after that point before he was declared medically dead. Controversy arose after he was observed gasping and appeared to choke during that time according to reporters who were allowed to be present, leading to questions about the dosing and timing of the drug administration, as well as the choice of drugs.

The usage of midazolam in executions became controversial after condemned inmate Clayton Lockett apparently regained consciousness and started speaking midway through his 2014 execution when the state of Oklahoma attempted to execute him with an untested three-drug lethal injection combination including 100 mg of midazolam. Prison officials reportedly discussed taking him to a hospital before he was pronounced dead of a heart attack 40 minutes after the execution began. An observing doctor stated that Lockett's vein had ruptured. It is not clear whether his death was caused by one or more of the drugs or by a problem in the administration procedure, nor is it clear what quantities of vecuronium bromide and potassium chloride were released to his system before the execution was cancelled.

According to news reports, the execution of Ronald Bert Smith in the state of Alabama on 8 December 2016 allegedly went awry due to the fact he displayed movement soon after midazolam was injected, although prison staff confirmed twice that he was still unconscious before injecting the two fatal drugs. This controversy again stirred concern among the public regarding the effectiveness of the drug in question.

In October 2016, the state of Ohio announced that it would resume executions in January 2017, using a formulation of midazolam, vecuronium bromide, and potassium chloride, but this was blocked by a federal judge. On 26 July 2017, Ronald Phillips was executed with a three-drug cocktail including midazolam after the Supreme Court refused to grant a stay. Prior to this, the last execution in Ohio had been that of Dennis McGuire. Murderer Gary Otte's lawyers unsuccessfully challenged his Ohio execution, arguing that midazolam might not protect him from serious pain when the other drugs are administered. He was pronounced dead without incident in about 14 minutes on 13 September 2017.

In April 2017, the state of Arkansas carried out a double-execution, of Jack Harold Jones, 52, and Marcel Williams, 46. Arkansas attempted to execute eight people before its supply of midazolam expired on 30 April 2017. Two of them were granted a stay of execution, and another, Ledell Lee, 51, was executed on 20 April 2017.

In October 2021, the state of Oklahoma executed inmate John Marion Grant, 60, using midazolam as part of its three-drug cocktail hours after the U.S. Supreme Court ruled to lift a stay of execution for Oklahoma death row inmates. The execution was the state's first since 2015. Witnesses to the execution said that when the first drug, midazolam, began to flow at 4:09 p.m., Grant started convulsing about two dozen times and vomited. Grant continued breathing, and a member of the execution team wiped the vomit off his face. At 4:15 p.m., officials said Grant was unconscious, and he was pronounced dead at 4:21 p.m.

==== Legal challenges ====
In Glossip v. Gross, attorneys for three Oklahoma inmates argued that midazolam could not achieve the level of unconsciousness required for surgery, meaning severe pain and suffering was likely. They argued that midazolam was cruel and unusual punishment and thus contrary to the Eighth Amendment to the United States Constitution. In June 2015, the U.S. Supreme Court ruled that they had failed to prove that midazolam was cruel and unusual when compared to known, available alternatives.

The state of Nevada is also known to use midazolam in execution procedures. In July 2018, one of the manufacturers accused state officials of obtaining the medication under pretences. This incident was the first time a drug company successfully, though temporarily, halted an execution. A previous attempt in 2017, to halt an execution in the state of Arizona by another drug manufacturer was not successful.
