= Robert Lynn Pruett =

American man executed in Texas (1979–2017)

- Mugshot of Robert Pruett
- Born: September 18, 1979; Houston, Texas, U.S.
- Died: October 12, 2017 (aged 38); Huntsville Unit, Texas, U.S.
- Status: Executed by lethal injection
- Convictions: Capital murder Murder
- Penalty: Death (April 30, 2002)

Details
- Victims: 2
- Date: August 9, 1995; December 17, 1999
- Country: United States
- State: Texas

Robert Lynn Pruett (September 18, 1979 – October 12, 2017) was a Texas man convicted and executed for the 1999 murder of TDCJ Correctional Officer Daniel Nagle. Pruett had been certified as an adult at 16 and was already serving a 99-year sentence for his involvement in the murder of Ray Yarborough, which occurred when Pruett was 15. Pruett was convicted along with Howard Steven "Sam" Pruett Sr., his father, who received a life sentence for his participation in the murder, and Howard Steven Pruett Jr., his brother, who received a 40-year sentence. Howard Sr. testified that neither son took part in the killing, as did Robert, who was nonetheless convicted under the Texas law of parties. Details of both the Yarborough and Nagle murders were featured in the BBC documentary Life and Death Row - Crisis Stage.

Pruett also denied involvement in Nagle's murder and his defense attorney stated that "what convicted him was the testimony of four or five convicts who received deals, of one kind or another, in exchange for the testimony against Pruett". For example, one witness, Harold Mitchell, testified that he had been offered a move to another prison in Virginia, near his family if he would testify that Pruett killed Nagle. If he did not, Mitchell would be charged with the murder of Nagle. The state relied on the testimony of Lisa Baylor, a forensic analyst who testified, using a now-debunked scientific method called "physical matching". Baylor linked the tape round the handle of the shank used to murder Nagle with a prison craft shop where a cellmate of Pruett worked.

Pruett died by lethal injection on October 12, 2017, after appeals for clemency to the Texas Board of Pardons and Paroles were rejected. Pruett started chanting during the execution and was visibly scared. Pruett was represented by the Texas Innocence Network and his attorneys pursued his innocence claim by appealing the denial of his DNA relief through the courts.

While in the Texas death row at the Polunsky Unit near Livingston, Pruett received 4 stays of execution.

Despite publicly maintaining his innocence, Pruett reportedly confessed in private to a pen pal in 2003. According to the story, Pruett said he had not intended to kill Nagle and regretted it.

== Conviction ==
A Nueces County jury found Pruett guilty of capital murder on April 24, 2002. The only witnesses to Nagle's murder were inmates. Nagle, who was the president of the AFSCME union local that represents McConnell guards, had complained that low pay, high turnover, and poor training of staff were turning Texas prisons into powderkegs. Nagle told supporters at the rally at the Governor's Mansion that "someone would have to be killed" before TDCJ got the message. He was murdered two weeks later.

There was no physical evidence linking Pruett with the murder, which he claimed he did not witness or participate in. When the murder weapon was tested for DNA, nothing conclusive was found. Nagle was killed as a result of a stabbing with a prison shank.

Pruett claimed he was framed by corrupt inmates and prison guards. Some Correctional Officers stated that corrupt Correctional Officers, known colloquially as "dirty bosses", were in league with prison gangs, and that they and their gang associates inside were involved with his murder. Weeks after the stabbing, Correctional Officers at the McConnell Unit were indicted for colluding with inmates to traffic drugs. Eliseo Martinez, one of the Correctional Officers interviewed during the investigation into Nagle's death, was arrested in late January 2000 for transporting a package believed to have contained $60,000 in laundered drug profits for inmates. Martinez claimed Pruett had told him he possessed a homemade shank during the investigation.

In 2014, Pruett's post-conviction writ of habeas corpus was denied, with Judges Alcala and Johnson dissenting.

In April 2017, Pruett's appeal was dismissed by the Court of Appeals for the 5th Circuit. The ruling that stated that the inconclusive DNA results wouldn't have had any effect on the jury's verdict had they been available during his 2002 trial. Pruett claims that the foreman of the jury that sentenced him to death asked him for forgiveness due to doubts about the safety of his conviction. As a result, Pruett's final death warrant was signed on June 26, 2017.

Judge Elsa Alcala wrote in a concurring opinion that "it appears there may be significant problems with the evidence of guilt and with the imposition of the death penalty in this case", and that the "Court should permit further litigation on appellant's post-conviction challenges in which he has sought to undermine the validity of his guilt and death sentence".

Pruett had written for inmate blog "Minutes Before Six".

== See also ==
- List of people executed in Texas, 2010–2019
- List of people executed in the United States in 2017

Executions carried out in Texas
| Preceded by Taichin Preyor July 27, 2017 | Robert Lynn Pruett; October 12, 2017 | Succeeded by Ruben Douglas Ramirez Cardenas November 8, 2017 |
Executions carried out in the United States
| Preceded by Michael Ray Lambrix – Florida October 5, 2017 | Robert Lynn Pruett – Texas; October 12, 2017 | Succeeded by Torrey Twane McNabb – Alabama October 19, 2017 |
