= Jack Harold Jones =

Executed American serial killer

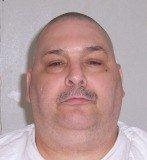
- Born: Jack Harold Jones Jr. August 10, 1964; Toledo, Ohio, U.S.
- Died: April 24, 2017 (aged 52); Cummins Unit, Arkansas, U.S.
- Status: Executed by lethal injection
- Convictions: Arkansas; Capital murder Attempted capital murder Rape; Florida; First degree murder
- Penalty: Arkansas; Death; Florida; Life imprisonment

Details
- Victims: 3+
- Span of crimes: 1983–1995
- Country: United States
- States: Florida and Arkansas
- Date apprehended: June 6, 1995
- Imprisoned at: Varner Unit

Jack Harold Jones Jr. (August 10, 1964 – April 24, 2017) was an American serial killer who murdered at least three women in Florida and Arkansas between 1983 and 1995. Convicted of two murders during his lifetime and executed in 2017, he was posthumously linked via DNA to the third murder, for which a serial rapist had pleaded no contest.

== Murders ==
=== Regina Harrison ===
On May 2, 1983, Regina Harrison, a 20-year-old college student, left her parents' home for a nightly bike ride in Hollywood's North Beach neighborhood, but failed to return home. Friends and family found her nude body in the woods in West Lake Park. She had been strangled to death and her body discarded. During the subsequent investigation, witnesses reported that they had seen the woman riding accompanied by a skinny, long-haired man on a black bike.

There were no leads in the case for five months, until a detective from Fort Lauderdale, John Curcio, saw a program airing the case on TV. He had been a member of an investigative unit which had captured Ronald Henry Stewart, a serial rapist who had terrorized women in Broward County, Florida and Harrison County, Mississippi in the late 1980s, and took notice that Stewart resembled the suspect sketch, in addition to being in possession of a black bike at the time of his arrest. A witness who said they had seen Regina and her alleged killer on the beach pointed to Stewart as the man she had seen, and he was soon charged with Harrison's murder. During questioning, Stewart confessed to the rapes, but not to the murder. He maintained his innocence in that case. Several factors pointed towards his innocence, including the fact that his fingerprints did not match those found at the crime scene.

Fearing a death sentence and offered a sentence that could run concurrently to his rape sentences, Stewart had entered a plea of no contest and was given 50 years imprisonment in January 1985, to run concurrently with his other sentences for the sexual offenses. Stewart died in prison from cancer in 2008.

=== Lori Barrett ===
Lorraine "Lori" Anne Barrett, a 32-year-old tourist from Bridgeville, Pennsylvania was last seen at the Elbo Room, a bar located at the corner of Las Olas Boulevard and A1A State Road. According to witnesses, she was accompanied by a heavily tattooed man to her motel room at the Days Inn Lauderdale Surf Motel on Seabreeze Boulevard. At about noon on June 1, 1991, her body was found by a cleaning lady. She had been raped and strangled.

Immediately following the body's discovery, police created a facial composite, complete with descriptions of the suspect's tattoos (barbed wire and hearts etched with names), and distributed it around Broward County. However, it was to no avail, and the case quickly went cold.

=== Mary Phillips ===
On June 6, 1995, Mary Phillips and her 11-year-old daughter, Lacey, were attacked at her office in Bald Knob, Arkansas. Jones, equipped with latex gloves, a wire, and a BB gun, broke into the office, He took Lacey to the bathroom and tied the girl to a chair. When he returned, Lacey, now crying, pleaded him not to hurt her mother. Jones replied, I'm not. I'm going to hurt you." He then choked her unconscious and attempted to beat her to death with the barrel of the BB gun, striking her at least eight times in the head. The girl suffered severe lacerations and multiple skull fractures. Jones also raped and murdered Mary Phillips.

== Arrest, trial, and imprisonment ==
The local sheriff's department dispatched three officers to the scene. Upon arrival, one officer entered the building and found Mary Phillips, deceased. He exited the building and told the other officers on scene that it was a scene of a homicide. When they reentered the building, they located Phillips' 11-year-old daughter, Lacey, in the building's bathroom, tied to a chair, beaten severely about the head and covered in blood. The officers initially believed Lacey to be deceased also, due to the severity of her injuries. However, while taking flash photographs of the bathroom crime scene, Lacey turned her head and looked at the crime scene photographer. Lacey Phillips was rushed to a nearby hospital for treatment. Once her condition stabilized, she gave a description of her assailant, a man with a tattoo on his arm and a teardrop tattoo under his left eye. The officers present during her interview identified the man she described as Jack Harold Jones, an Ohio native who was well known to police. Jones was brought in for interrogation and confessed to the crime. He was brought to trial, found guilty, and sentenced to death for killing Mary Phillips.

While awaiting execution on Arkansas' death row, Jones's DNA was entered into CODIS, the nationwide DNA database. Years later, in 2003, it was matched to the DNA evidence of the Lori Barrett case. A second test was conducted at the state crime lab in Arkansas, which conclusively proved that Jack Jones was the perpetrator. The Florida authorities issued an extradition warrant for Jones, who by this time was appealing his death sentence in Arkansas for the third time. He was eventually tried for the Barrett murder, found guilty, sentenced to life imprisonment, and returned to await his execution back in Arkansas.

Over the years, Jones' execution was stayed several times, due to illnesses such as high blood pressure and diabetes, which resulted in one of his legs being amputated. According to his sister Lynn, Jack had suffered sexual and physical abuse as a child, which led to alcohol and drug dependency. His sister's statements notwithstanding, Jones himself expressed regret over his actions and agreed with his sentence, explaining that he was haunted by the ghosts of his victims and was incapable of forgiving himself for what he did.

== Execution and posthumous confession ==
On April 24, 2017, Jones was executed at the Cummins Unit, along with fellow rapist-murderer Marcel Williams, marking the first double execution in the country in 17 years. Jones and Williams were two of four inmates executed in Arkansas in April 2017, the other two were convicted murderers Ledell Lee and Kenneth Williams. Jones' last meal consisted of fried chicken, potato logs with tartar sauce, beef jerky bites, three candy bars, a chocolate milkshake, and fruit punch.

Shortly before his execution, he gave his sister a letter he had penned in 2006, with instructions to open it a year after his execution date. In the letter, he confessed in detail to the murder of Regina Harrison, providing details only the killer would know. This revelation led to his body being exhumed and his DNA tested, and in February 2019, the Broward County Attorney's Office officially announced that Jones was the real killer, not Ronald Stewart. A spokeswoman for the attorney's office, Paula McMahon, said in a press release that they would work to vacate Stewart's conviction, and would further investigate Jones' past in order to determine if he had killed other victims in Florida, or elsewhere around the country.

For the next nine years, the executions of Williams and Jones in Arkansas remained the most recent instance of a U.S. death penalty state carrying out two executions on the same day. That record was surpassed on July 28, 2026, when Florida executed James Aren Duckett and Dominick Occhicone on the same day.

== See also ==
- Capital punishment in Arkansas
- List of people executed in Arkansas
- List of people executed in the United States in 2017
- List of serial killers in the United States

Executions carried out in Arkansas
Preceded by Ledell Lee April 20, 2017	Jack Harold Jones; April 24, 2017	Succeeded by Marcel Williams April 24, 2017
Executions carried out in the United States
Preceded by Ledell Lee – Arkansas April 20, 2017	Jack Harold Jones – Arkansas; April 24, 2017	Succeeded by Marcel Williams – Arkansas April 24, 2017
