= Capital punishment in Arkansas =

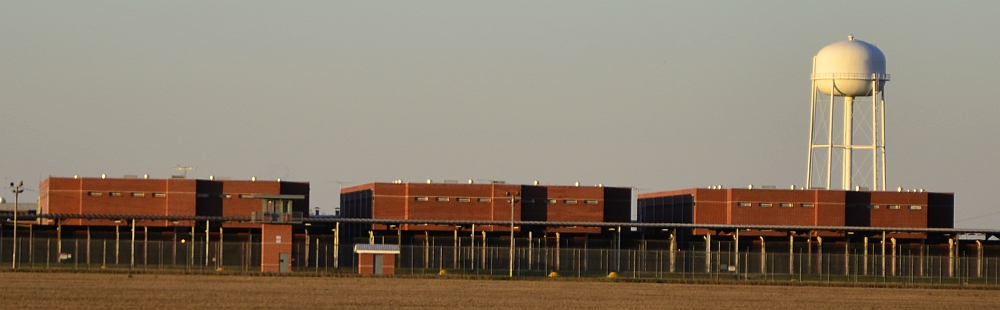
The Varner Unit, pictured here, houses the State of Arkansas death row for men

Capital punishment is a legal penalty in the U.S. state of Arkansas.

Since 1820, a total of 505 individuals have been executed. According to the Arkansas Department of Correction, as of April 13, 2026, a total of 23 men were under a sentence of death in the state.

== History ==
All but four executions in Arkansas carried out before 1913 were by hanging. The exceptions were four Confederate guerrillas were shot by the military on July 29, 1864, for the murder of a Unionist civilian. On July 25, 1902, seven men were hanged, the most executions in one day in the state.

In 1887, Arkansas ended public executions. However, on March 7, 1901, the state legislature approved legislation to provide for the public hangings of convicted rapists. The law, which was signed by Governor Jeff Davis, was intended to deter lynching. It had been passed out of fear that John Wesley, a black man on death row for raping a 17-year-old white girl, would be lynched prior to his execution. A crowd had previously burned an effigy of Wesley. Prior to his execution, Wesley confessed to raping the girl and two other white women. Four other black men, Charles Anderson, Essex Pippin, Hall Mahone, and Elisha Davis, would be publicly hanged for rape between 1901 and 1904. A white man, Charles Hammons, was publicly hanged in 1905 for raping his 8-year-old stepdaughter. The law was repealed later that year.

Almost all executions were for crimes that involved murder. A number of people were also executed for rape, and there was one execution for espionage, 17-year-old alleged Confederate spy David O. Dodd, hanged by Union soldiers on January 8, 1864.

In 1913, the method used was changed to the electric chair. The electric chair was constructed from the wood that had previously made up the state gallows. This electric chair was used for all electrocutions until 1964. Four more people were hanged in the state — one in 1913, two in 1914, and one in 1930.

The last execution in the state before Furman v. Georgia was that of Charles Fields on January 24, 1964, for rape. New capital punishment laws were passed in Arkansas and took effect on March 23, 1973. The first execution would not come until June 18, 1990, when John Edward Swindler was electrocuted. He was the first and so far only execution using an electric chair constructed by the state in the 1970s.

According to Michael L. Radelet of the University of Colorado, there have been two instances of executions that did not go according to plan in Arkansas since Furman. On January 24, 1992, the execution of Rickey Ray Rector was delayed by fifty minutes after the medical staff was unable to find a suitable vein in his arm. The curtain over the witness area was not drawn, and witnesses heard Rector moan loudly eight times. State officials attributed the difficulties to his size and use of antipsychotic medication. The execution of Christina Marie Riggs faced similar delays on May 2, 2000, when staff were unable to locate a vein in her elbow. They eventually found one in her wrist.

There have been at least three death row volunteers in Arkansas: Ronald Gene Simmons, Christina Marie Riggs, and Clay King Smith.

In April 2017, the state planned to execute eight death row inmates before the stocks of the sedative midazolam expired at the end of April, but ultimately only four were put to death that month. A federal judge initially issued an injunction preventing the executions, but the Eighth Circuit Court of Appeals overturned the ruling, and the United States Supreme Court rejected a claim that the accelerated execution schedule was "cruel and unusual punishment." On April 20, at about 11:30 PM CST, they were allowed to proceed. At 11:56 PM CST, four minutes prior to the expiration of his execution warrant, Ledell Lee was executed, making him the first inmate in Arkansas to be executed since 2005. On April 24, Jack Harold Jones and Marcel Williams were executed, the first double execution in the United States in 17 years. The last of the four inmates put to death in April 2017 was serial killer Kenneth Williams, who was found guilty of murdering a farmer during his prison escape and sentenced to death; Williams was also convicted of two more murders but was given two life sentences for these other killings. Williams, whose death sentence was carried out on April 27, 2017, remains the last person executed in Arkansas as of 2024.

In February 2025, a bill was proposed to allow the state to execute criminals by nitrogen hypoxia, a method first used by Alabama in 2024 to execute four of its condemned inmates between January 2024 and February 2025. A legislative panel voted 10-5 to grant approval to the Bill, and it advanced to the House for further review. The bill swiftly passed in the Arkansas House of Representatives by a majority vote of 67-23 on March 4, 2025, The bill passed in the Arkansas Senate by a majority vote of 26-9 on March 11, 2025. The Arkansas governor Sarah Huckabee Sanders signed the bill into law on March 18, 2025. Arkansas became the fifth state in the US, joining Alabama, Oklahoma, Mississippi, and Louisiana, to allow executions by nitrogen hypoxia.

== Territorial history (1819–1836) ==
The Arkansas State Capitol in Little Rock, where the General Assembly enacts statutory changes governing capital punishment.

During the Arkansas territorial period, capital punishment was governed by common law traditions and early statutory enactments by the territorial legislature. Under territorial criminal statutes, capital offenses extended beyond homicide to encompass a variety of property and major felony crimes, including horse stealing, slave stealing, killing a bystander during a breaking and entering, arson committed by an enslaved person, rescuing a condemned prisoner, and harboring fugitives or stolen property.

Executions during the territorial era were carried out exclusively through public hangings administered by local authorities. The standard method of hanging involved placing the condemned individual on the bed of a horse-drawn wagon with a noose secured around their neck, after which the wagon was driven away to induce strangulation.

The first recorded judicial execution in Arkansas Territory took place in Little Rock in May 1828, when John Strickland was hanged following his conviction for the axe slaying of a fellow soldier. Between 1828 and the transition to statehood in 1836, six additional public executions were documented under territorial jurisdiction:

- William Lockhart (hanged July 7, 1830 in Helena) following a conviction for murder.
- Joseph Bowers (hanged August 26, 1830 in Little Rock) following a conviction for murder after multiple jail escapes.
- William Stephenson (hanged February 7, 1832) for horse stealing.
- Charles S. Cooke (hanged April 29, 1833 in Clark County).
- Morgan Williams (hanged May 16, 1835 in Little Rock).
- Dixon Nobles (hanged May 22, 1835 in Miller County).

Public executions routinely attracted large crowds from surrounding counties. Following the execution of Morgan Williams in May 1835, prominent Arkansas writer and lawyer Albert Pike published an editorial in the Arkansas Advocate calling for the abolition of public hangings in favor of private executions conducted behind prison walls. Pike and other reform advocates urged the territorial assembly to erect a central state penitentiary to facilitate secure confinement as an alternative to public corporal and capital punishment. However, the state penitentiary was not completed and opened until 1842.

== Method transitions and statutory evolution ==
Prior to 1913, all legal executions in Arkansas were conducted by individual county sheriffs using public hanging. In 1913, the Arkansas General Assembly enacted statutory revisions that centralized execution authority under state prison management and mandated electrocution via an electric chair housed at the Arkansas State Penitentiary as the sole legal execution method. Between 1913 and 1964, the state executed 157 individuals by electrocution.

Following the United States Supreme Court's decision in Furman v. Georgia (1972), which temporarily invalidated state death penalty laws, Arkansas revised its criminal code to establish bifurcated capital trials. In 1983, the General Assembly enacted legislation establishing lethal injection as the state's primary execution method for offenses committed after July 4, 1983, while retaining electrocution as an option for inmates sentenced under prior statutes. Male death row prisoners are held at the Varner Unit Supermax facility in Lincoln County, with executions carried out in the execution chamber at the nearby Cummins Unit.

== Legal process ==
When the prosecution seeks the death penalty, the sentence is decided by the jury and must be unanimous.

In case of a hung jury during the penalty phase of the trial, a life sentence is issued, even if a single juror opposed death (there is no retrial).

The Governor of Arkansas has the power of clemency with respect to death sentences. The governor receives for that purpose a non-binding report from the Arkansas Board of Pardons and Paroles.

The methods of execution are lethal injection and nitrogen hypoxia. Those sentenced to death before July 4, 1983 were also able to choose from electrocution, though there are no longer any inmates on death row who were sentenced before that date. If lethal injection and nitrogen hypoxia are ever ruled unconstitutional, electrocution shall be used to replace them.

Executions in Arkansas are currently performed at the Cummins Unit.

== Capital crimes ==
The following are capital crimes in Arkansas:

- Rape, if the victim was 13 years of age or younger at the time; and
- Treason; and
- Murder involving one or more of the following aggravating factors:
1. The murder was committed by an offender imprisoned as a result of a felony conviction.
2. The murder was committed by an offender who escaped after being sentenced to imprisonment as a result of a felony conviction.
3. The offender previously committed another felony, an element of which was the use or threat of violence to another person or the creation of a substantial risk of death or serious physical injury to another person.
4. The offender in the commission of the capital murder knowingly created a great risk of death to a person other than the victim or caused the death of more than one person in the same criminal episode.
5. The murder was committed for the purpose of avoiding or preventing an arrest or effecting an escape from custody.
6. The murder was committed for pecuniary gain.
7. The murder was committed for the purpose of disrupting or hindering the lawful exercise of any government or political function.
8. The murder was committed in an especially cruel or depraved manner, that is, preceded by mental anguish, serious physical abuse, or torture upon the victim prior to the murder.
9. The murder was committed by means of a destructive device, bomb, explosive, or similar device that the person planted, hid, or concealed in any place, area, dwelling, building, or structure, or mailed or delivered, or caused to be planted, hidden, concealed, mailed, or delivered, and the person knew that his or her act would create a great risk of death to human life.
10. The murder was committed against a person whom the defendant knew or reasonably should have known was especially vulnerable to the attack because:
  - Of either a temporary or permanent severe physical or mental disability which would interfere with the victim's ability to flee or to defend himself or herself; or
  - The victim was 12 years of age or younger.

== Death row ==
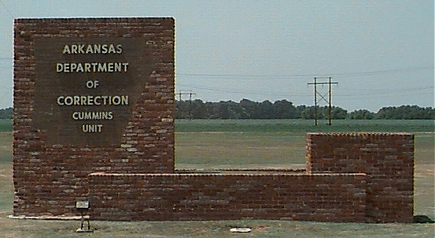
Cummins Unit houses the State of Arkansas execution chamber

Male death row inmates are located at the Arkansas Department of Correction Varner Unit's Supermax, while the executions are performed at the Cummins Unit, adjacent to Varner. The female death row is located at the McPherson Unit. In 1999, the female death row was newly inaugurated.

In 1974, male death row inmates previously at the Tucker Unit, were moved to the Cummins Unit. In 1986, male death row inmates were moved to the Maximum Security Unit. On Friday August 22, 2003, all 39 Arkansas death row inmates, all of them male, were moved to the Supermax at the Varner Unit.

== See also ==
- List of people executed in Arkansas
- List of people executed in Arkansas (pre-1972)
- List of death row inmates in the United States § Arkansas
- Crime in Arkansas
- Law of Arkansas
