= Prison farm =

Correctional facility where convicts work on a farm

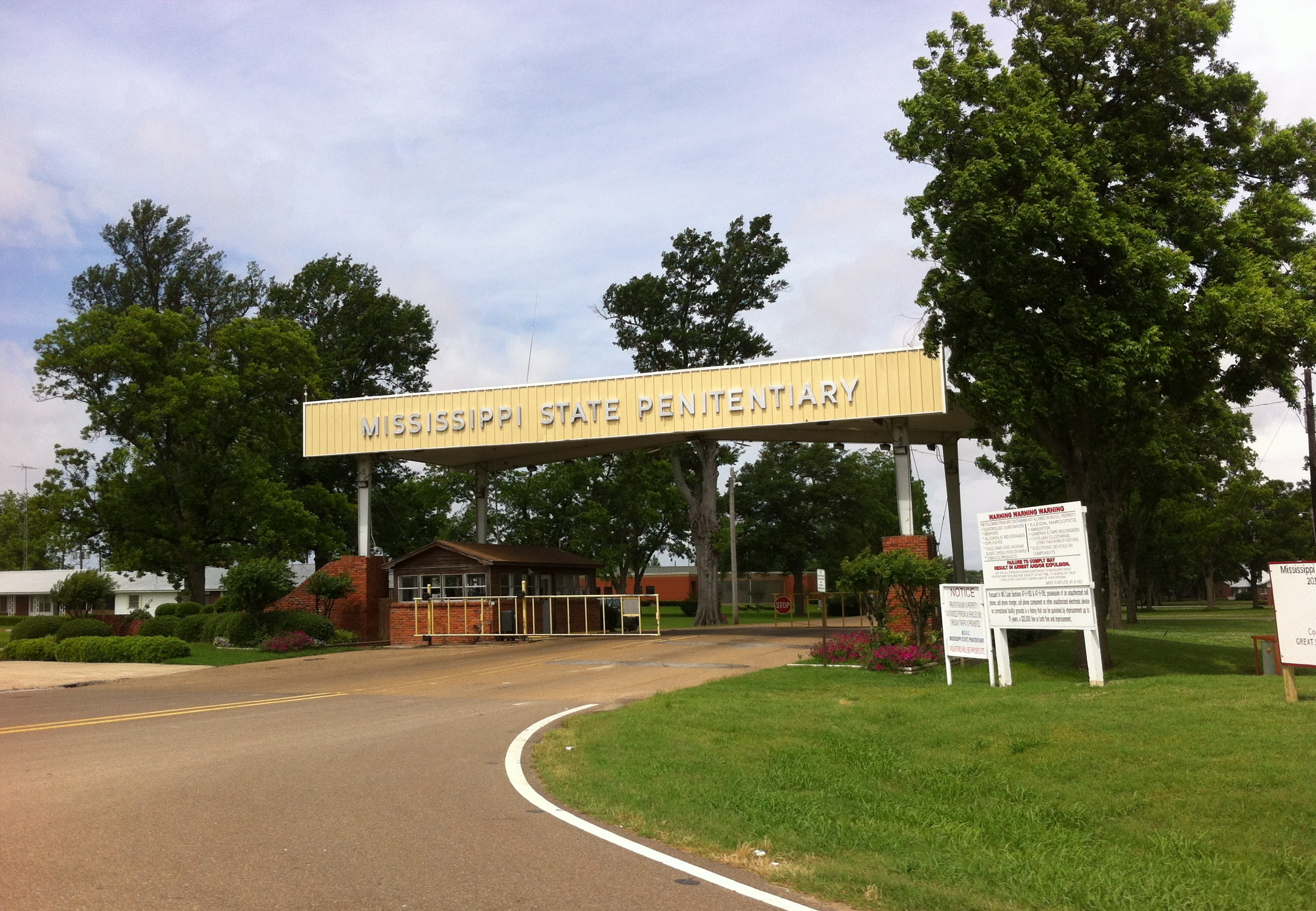
Mississippi State Penitentiary, an American prison farm in Sunflower County, Mississippi

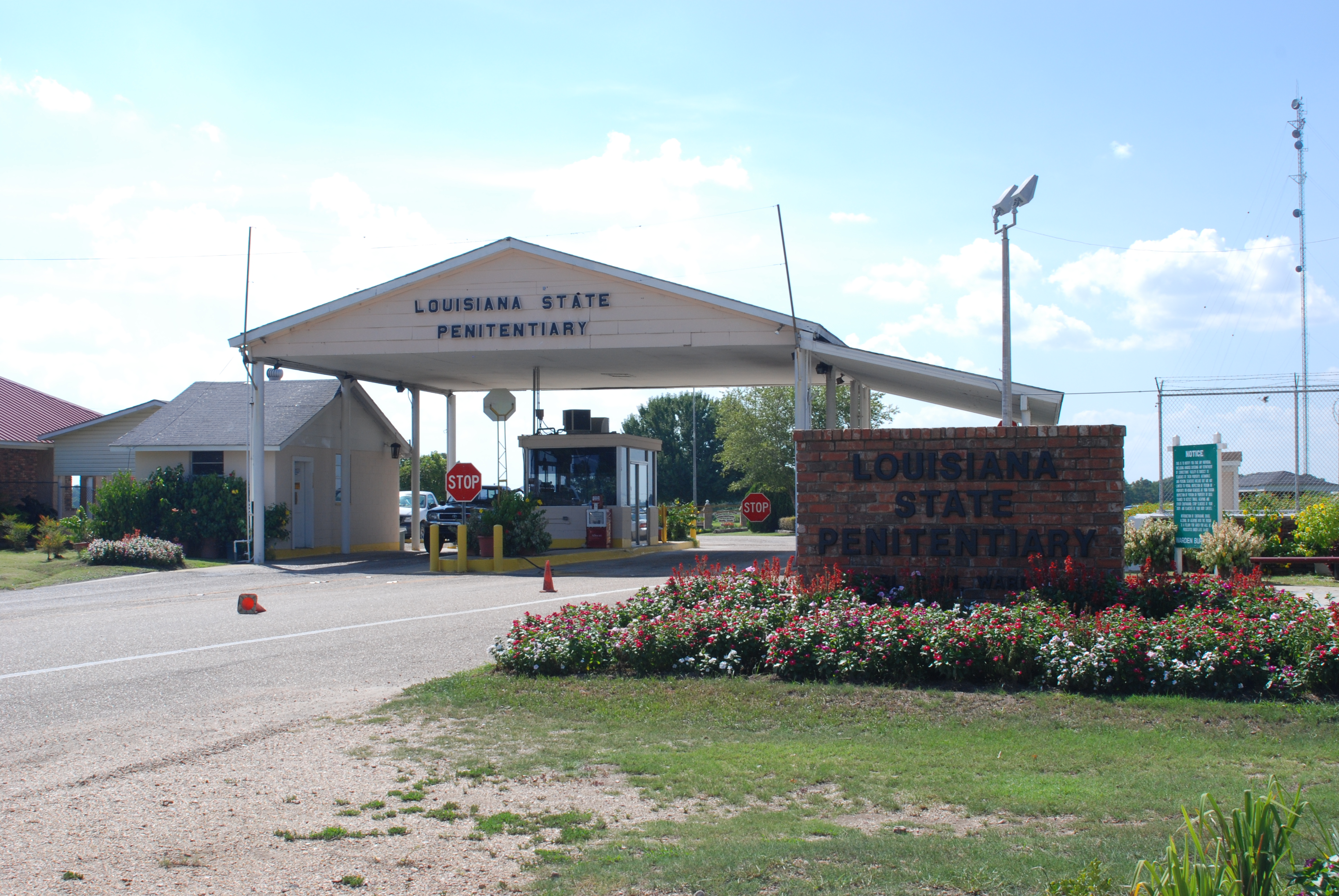
Louisiana State Penitentiary, an American prison farm in West Feliciana Parish, Louisiana

A prison farm (also known as a penal farm) is a large correctional facility where penal labor convicts work—legally or illegally—on a farm (in the wide sense of a productive unit), usually for manual labor, largely in the open air, such as in agriculture, logging, quarrying, and mining. In the United States, such forced labor is made legal by the thirteenth amendment to the Constitution; however, some other parts of the world have made penal labor illegal. The concepts of prison farm and labor camp overlap, with the idea that the prisoners are forced to work. The historical equivalent on a very large scale was called a penal colony.

The agricultural goods produced by prison farms are generally used primarily to feed the prisoners themselves and other wards of the state (residents of orphanages, asylums, etc.), and secondarily, to be sold for whatever profit the state may be able to obtain.

In addition to being forced to labor directly for the government on a prison farm or in a penal colony, inmates may be forced to do farm work for private enterprises by being farmed out through the practice of convict leasing to work on private agricultural lands or related industries (fishing, lumbering, etc.). The party purchasing their labor from the government generally does so at a steep discount from the market labor cost.

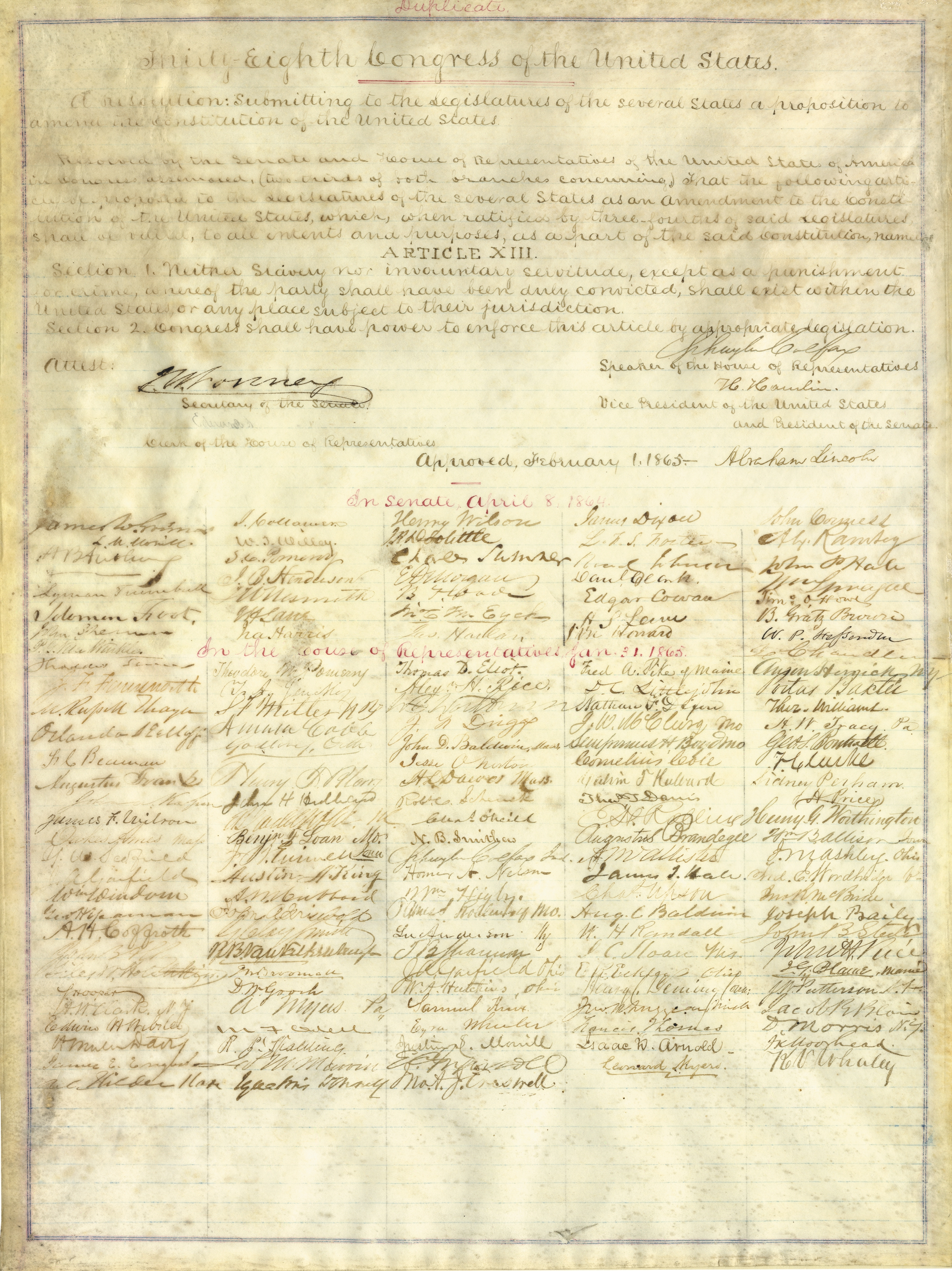
The 13th Amendment that Abraham Lincoln signed.

Louisiana State Penitentiary is the largest prison farm in the U.S., covering 18,000 acres (7,300 hectares); it is bordered on three sides by the Mississippi River.

Canada had six federal prison farms, which were closed in 2010. In 2019, two of the farms have been gradually reopened.

== Convict leasing ==
Convict leasing was a system of penal labor that was primarily practiced in the Southern United States, widely involved the use of African-American men, and was prominently used after the American Civil War. In this system, southern states leased prisoners to large plantations and private mines or railways. This system led to the states earning a profit, while the prisoners earned no pay and faced dangerous working conditions.

The 13th Amendment to the United States Constitution prohibited the use of slavery and involuntary servitude but explicitly exempts those who have been convicted of a crime. In response to this, the southern state legislatures implemented "Black Codes", which were laws that explicitly applied to African-Americans and subjected them to criminal prosecution for minor offenses like breaking curfew, loitering, and not carrying proof of employment. These new laws led to more prisoners for the penal system that could all be leased by the state so that it can use their labor for profit. Widespread convict leasing ended by World War II, but the loopholes in the 13th Amendment still permit the use of prisoners to work without pay.

== Other work programs ==
Convicts may also be leased for non-agricultural work, either directly to state entities, or to private industry. For example, prisoners may make license plates under contract to the state department of motor vehicles, work in textile or other state-run factories, or may perform data processing for outside firms. Other types of work include food service or groundskeeping. These laborers are typically considered to be a part of prison industries and not prison farms.

== In the United States (partial list) ==
State	Facility	Type of work
Alabama	Draper Correctional Facility	Farming
Alabama	G.K. Fountain Correctional Facility	Cattle and Agricultural Operations, and Vegetable Gardens
Alabama	Limestone Correctional Facility	Cattle and Farming
Alaska	Point MacKenzie Correctional Farm	Hogs, Cattle, Turkeys, and Chickens, Produce Operations, and Hydroponics Program
Arkansas	Cummins Unit	Horse and Agricultural Operations
Arkansas	East Arkansas Regional Unit	Farming
Arkansas	Grimes Unit	Agricultural Gardening Program
Arkansas	North Central Unit	Garden and Forage Production
Arkansas	Ouachita River Unit	Livestock and Forage Production, Gravel Harvesting
Arkansas	Pine Bluff Unit	Horse operation
Arkansas	Tucker Unit	Agricultural Operations
Arkansas	Wrightsville Unit	Horse Operations, Agricultural Operations
California	California State Prison, Corcoran	Dairy/Milk Processing
California	Central California Women's Facility	Farming
California	Valley State Prison	Farming
California	Wasco State Prison	Farming
Colorado	Buena Vista Correctional Complex	Fish Hatchery
Colorado	Four Mile Correctional Center	Dairy, Wild Horse Inmate Program
Colorado	Rifle Correctional Center	Timber
Colorado	Skyline Correctional Center	Fish Hatchery, Farming, Vineyard, Goat and Water Buffalo Dairy, Mountain Sheep
Florida	Apalachee Correctional Institution, West Unit / P.R.I.D.E.	Beef Cattle, Lumber, Agricultural
Florida	Charlotte Correctional Institution / P.R.I.D.E.	Citrus
Florida	Union Correctional Institution / P.R.I.D.E.	Beef Cattle, Lumber
Georgia	Arrendale State Prison	Cattle and Swine, Hay Farming
Georgia	Dooly State Prison	Farm Services
Georgia	Montgomery State Prison	Poultry and Egg Production
Georgia	Rogers State Prison	Dairy, Beef Cattle, Swine, Farming
Georgia	Washington State Prison	Farming
Hawaii	Halawa Correctional Facility / Hawaii Correctional Industries	Farming
Hawaii	Waiawa Correctional Facility	Farming
Louisiana	Louisiana State Penitentiary (Angola)	Farming
Mississippi	Mississippi State Penitentiary(Parchman) / Mississippi Prison Agricultural Enterprises	Farming
Mississippi	South Mississippi Correctional Institution / Mississippi Prison Agricultural Enterprises	Farming
North Carolina	Roanoke River Correctional Institution (formerly Caledonia Correctional Institution/Caledonia State Prison Farm)	Farming and Cannery
North Carolina	Dan River Prison Work Farm	Farming
North Carolina	Tyrrell Prison Work Farm	Farming
Texas	George Beto Unit (Beto Unit)	Farming, Cow/Calf Operations, Poultry Laying Operations, Pork Processing, and Swine Farrowing etc.
Texas	Dolph Briscoe Unit	Farming
Texas	James "Jay" H. Byrd Unit (Byrd Unit)	Hay Production
Texas	Clemens Unit	Beef Cattle, Farming, Swine Finishing
Texas	William P. Clements Unit (Clements Unit)	Beef Processing
Texas	H. H. Coffield Unit (Coffield Unit)	Farming, Cow/Calf Operations, Poultry Laying Operations, Pork Processing, Swine Farrowing etc.
Texas	Christina Melton Crain Unit (Crain Unit)	Farming, Swine Finishing
Texas	Price Daniel Unit	Farming
Texas	Memorial Unit (formerly Darrington Unit)	Farming, Cow/Calf Operations, Egg Operations, and Swine Finishing Operations
Texas	J. Dale Wainwright Unit (formerly Eastham Unit)	Cow/Calf Operations, Egg Operations, Farming, and Swine Operations
Texas	O.B. Ellis Unit (Ellis Unit)	Cotton Gin, Cow/Calf Operations, Farming, and Swine Operations
Texas	W. J. "Jim" Estelle Unit (Estelle Unit)	Cotton Gin, Cow/Calf Operations, Farming, and Swine Operations
Texas	Jim Ferguson Unit (Ferguson Unit)	Farming, Bull Management, and Swine Operations
Texas	Glen Ray Goodman Transfer Facility	Hay Production
Texas	Thomas Goree Unit (Goree Unit)	Horse Breeding
Texas	Joe F. Gurney Transfer Facility (Gurney Unit)	Farming, Cow/Calf Operations, Poultry Laying Operations, Pork Processing, and Swine Farrowing etc.
Texas	Hilltop Unit	Farming, Swine Finishing
Texas	William P. Hobby Unit (Hobby Unit)	Farming and Peach Orchard
Texas	Reverend C.A. Holliday Transfer Facility (Holliday Unit)	Farming, Egg Operations, Swine Operations, Horse Breeding Operations, and Veterinary Services
Texas	Alfred D. Hughes Unit (Hughes Unit)	Farming, Swine Finishing
Texas	Beauford H. Jester I Unit (Jester I Unit)	Swine Finishing, Mechanical Shop, and Combine Shed
Texas	Beauford H. Jester III Unit (Jester III Unit)	Swine Finishing, Mechanical Shop, and Combine Shed
Texas	Clyde M. Johnston Unit	Hay Production
Texas	O.L. Luther Unit	Cow/Calf Operations, Farming, Swine Operations, and Buffalo Ranch
Texas	Mark W. Michael Unit (Michael Unit)	Farming, Cow/Calf Operations, Poultry Laying Operations, Pork Processing, and Swine Farrowing etc.
Texas	Mountain View Unit	Farming, Swine Finishing
Texas	Dr. Lane Murray Unit (Murray Unit)	Farming, Swine Finishing
Texas	Nathaniel J. Neal Unit	Beef Processing
Texas	Wallace Pack Unit (Pack Unit)	Cow/Calf Operations, Farming, Swine Operations, and Buffalo Ranch
Texas	Allan B. Polunsky Unit (Polunsky unit)	Tree Farm
Texas	Louis C. Powledge Unit (Powledge Unit)	Farming, Cow/Calf Operations, Poultry Laying Operations, Pork Processing, and Swine Farrowing etc.
Texas	W. F. Ramsey Unit (Ramsey Unit)	Farming, Cow/Calf Operations, Cotton Gin, Farm Shop, Vegetable Cannery, Grain Storage, Swine Operations, and Alfalfa Dehydrator
Texas	Retrieve (later Wayne Scott) Unit (Scott Unit)	Cow/Calf Operations, Egg Operations, Swine Operations, Farming, Farm Shop, and Grain Storage
Texas	A.M. "Mac" Stringfellow Unit (Stringfellow Unit)	Farming, Cow/Calf Operations, Cotton Gin, Farm Shop, Vegetable Cannery, Grain Storage, Swine Operations, and Alfalfa Dehydrator
Texas	Barry B. Telford Unit (Telford Unit)	Cow/Calf Operations and Farming
Texas	C.T. Terrell Unit (Terrell Unit)	Farming, Cow/Calf Operations, Cotton Gin, Farm Shop, Vegetable Cannery, Grain Storage, Swine Operations, and Alfalfa Dehydrator
Texas	Carol S. Vance Unit (Vance Unit)	Swine Finishing, Mechanical Shop, and Combine Shed
Texas	Daniel Webster Wallace Unit	Hay Production
Texas	John M. Wynne Unit (Wynne Unit)	Farming, Egg Operations, Swine Operations, Horse Breeding Operations, and Veterinary Services

== Canadian Prison Farm System ==
Canada has a long history of prison farms dating back to the first penitentiary in the 1890s, but in 2010, the federal Conservative government shut down its six federal prison farms. At this point, the prison farm program was under CORCAN, Correctional Service Canada's job and rehabilitation program, and the government argued that the skills that prison farms had been giving people in prison were outdated, and that prison labor should focus on work related to more modern skills. They also argued that the farms were losing money, which would later be debated.

The debate as to whether or not the farms should reopen continued, particularly through a group called Save our Prison Farms (SOPF) who, according to their website, advocated for saving the prison farms because of 1) public safety, 2) health and rehabilitation, 3) saving taxpayers money, 4) sustainable local farm and food systems, and 5) a model of Canadian values and heritage.

In 2018, however, the federal Liberal government announced the re-opening of the Penitentiary Farm Program with a budget of $4.3 million for the two farms in Kingston, Ontario to return. The prison farms at Joyceville Institution and Collins Bay Institution are now open and working.

== Legal framework ==
The 13th Amendment to the United States Constitution, which ended slavery, specifically carved out the concept of penal servitude (i.e., forced and unpaid labor as a punishment for a crime). This exemption only affected those who have been convicted of crimes, not those who were still awaiting trial.

Britain had a long history of penal servitude even before passage of the Penal Servitude Act 1853 (16 & 17 Vict. c. 99), and routinely used convict labor to settle its conquests, either through penal colonies or by selling convicts to settlers to serve for a term of years as indentured servants.

== Scope ==
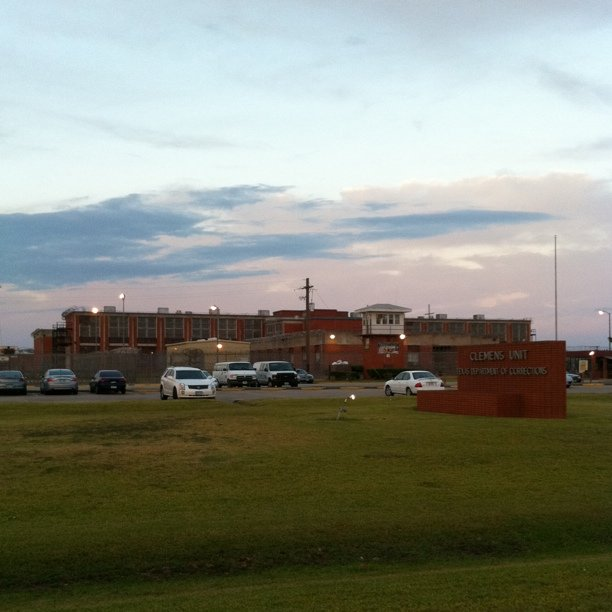
The Clemens Unit, a prison farm in Brazoria County, Texas

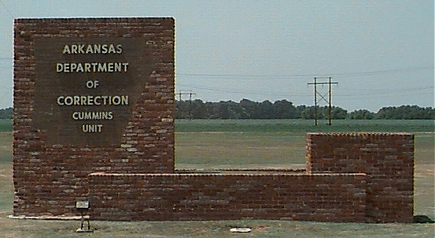
The Cummins Unit, a prison farm in Lincoln County, Arkansas

This type of penal institution has mainly been implanted in rural regions of vast countries. For example, the following passage describes the prison system of the U.S. state of North Carolina in the early twentieth century:

"The state prison is at Raleigh, although most of the convicts are distributed upon farms owned and operated by the state. The lease system does not prevail, but the farming out of convict labor is permitted by the constitution; such labor is used chiefly for the building of railways, the convicts so employed being at all times cared for and guarded by state officials. A reformatory for white youth between the ages of seven and sixteen, under the name of the Stonewall Jackson Manual Training and Industrial School, was opened at Concord in 1909, and in March 1909 the Foulk Reformatory and Manual Training School for negro youth was provided for. Charitable and penal institutions are under the supervision of a Board of Public Charities, appointed by the governor for a period of six years, the terms of the different members expiring in different years. Private institutions for the care of the insane, idiots, feeble-minded, and inebriates may be established, but must be licensed and regulated by the state board and become legally a part of the system of public charities."

In 21st-century Illinois, several prisons continue to run farms to produce food for wards of the state, including the prisoners themselves. The 1911 Britannica also reported that the state of Rhode Island had a farm of 667 acres (2.70 km^{2}) in the southern part of Cranston City housing (and presumably taking labor from):

"the state prison, the Providence county jail, the state workhouse and the house of correction, the state almshouse, the state hospital for the insane, the Sockanosset school for boys, and the Oaklawn school for girls, the last two being departments of the state reform school."

== In fiction ==
Films and television shows featuring prison farms and forced prison labor:

- I Am a Fugitive from a Chain Gang is a movie released in 1932, which depicted the degrading and inhumane treatment on chain gangs in the post–World War I era.
- Hell's Highway (1932)
- Prison Farm (1938)
- Gone with the Wind (1939) scenes of Scarlett O'Hara's leased convicts at work in her lumber mills
- Sullivan's Travels (1941)
- City Without Men (1943)
- Chain Gang (1950) starred Douglas Kennedy (actor) as a reporter working as a guard to expose corruption and brutality.
- Cool Hand Luke (1967)
- Sounder (1972)
- Papillon (1973)
- Scarecrow (1973)
- Nightmare in Badham County (1976)
- They Went That-A-Way & That-A-Way (1978)
- Brubaker (1980)
- Life (1999)
- O Brother, Where Art Thou? (2000)
- Civil Brand (2002)
- In "Les Misérables" by Victor Hugo, which has had several movie adaptations, the character Jean Valjean is part of a chain gang ("le bagne", which is usually translated as "the galleys" or "the prison hulks") as part of his punishment for stealing bread.

== See also ==
- Care farming
- Chain gang
- Gorgona Agricultural Penal Colony
- Iwahig Prison and Penal Farm
- Old Atlanta Prison Farm
- Tom Murton
- Trusty system
