= Murder of Jesse Dirkhising =

1999 child murder in Rogers, Arkansas

Jesse Dirkhising
- Dirkhising
- Born: Jesse William Dirkhising; May 24, 1986; Oxford, Ohio, U.S.
- Died: September 26, 1999 (aged 13); Rogers, Arkansas, U.S.
- Cause of death: Drugging and positional asphyxia
- Parents: Miles Yates Jr. (father); Tina Yates (mother)

Jesse William Dirkhising (May 24, 1986 – September 26, 1999), also known as Jesse Yates, was an American teenager from Prairie Grove, Arkansas. He was staying with two men (with his parents' permission) who bound, drugged, tortured, and repeatedly raped him. He died from drugging and positional asphyxia during the ordeal.

Despite his being at their home with approval from his parents, the defense argued he was complicit in the sexual acts, and therefore the death was accidental. However, Arkansas law at the time established the age of legal consent at 14. Therefore, consent on his part would be irrelevant; any adult engaging in sexual intercourse with a 13-year-old would be guilty of statutory rape. Further details revealed in the court case depicted a gruesome death.

Dirkhising's death received only regional media coverage until a Washington Times article ran a story nearly a month after his death, noting the lack of national coverage in contrast to that given to the 1998 death of Matthew Shepard. The Shepard murder was approaching its first anniversary and was getting renewed national attention, coupled with updates on pending hate crime legislation. Prompted by coverage in The Washington Times, the Dirkhising case gained notoriety as conservative commentators compared media coverage of the two cases and explored the issues of what was considered a hate crime. The added attention resulted in mainstream media also reporting the Dirkhising case in relation to the coverage of the Shepard case, with many attempting to explain why the two were handled differently by the media, and perhaps received differently by readers.

The media coverage of the Dirkhising case was repeatedly and consistently contrasted with that of the high-profile Shepard case, although the cases were dissimilar in several important details. While both victims died as the result of assaults by two men, Dirkhising was a minor and the victim of a sex crime, while the adult Shepard was ostensibly murdered as part of a hate crime. While both heterosexuality and homosexuality have been cited as issues in both cases, the circumstances were different and in contrast: Shepard was an openly gay man who was attacked by two heterosexual men, while Dirkhising was raped by two men who were described as lovers in a police affidavit.

== Background ==
Dirkhising was the son of Tina and Miles Yates Jr. from the small town of Prairie Grove, Arkansas. At the time of his death he was 13 and in seventh grade. Davis Carpenter, who was charged with his murder, was then 38, and lived about 30 miles (48 km) away in Rogers, a "small but booming northwest Arkansas town." 22-year-old Joshua Macave Brown shared Carpenter's apartment. Carpenter, who managed a beauty salon, was a friend of Dirkhising's parents. Dirkhising had stayed with the two men at their apartment on weekends only to work at the salon to make money to rebuild his car for two months prior to his death. Brown had been sexually molesting Dirkhising for two months before his death; he claimed that the boy was a willing participant. But because Dirkhising was under the age of 14, Arkansas law would make consent impossible. Moreover, Jesse was dating a girl, lending skepticism to claims about his willingness to engage in sex with men. Jesse's family had been told that he was helping out at the salon.

== Death and investigation ==
On September 26, 1999, Dirkhising's murder was discovered by police of Rogers, Arkansas, when they responded to a 911 call. They went to the home of Davis Carpenter, where Joshua Brown was also present. Police found that Dirkhising had been tied to a mattress and that his ankles, knees, and wrists had been bound with duct tape and belts. Dirkhising had been gagged with his own underwear, a bandana and duct tape. Brown told police they had given Dirkhising an enema of urine dosed with amitriptyline, an antidepressant and a sedative. Police determined that Dirkhising had been repeatedly raped over a period of several hours. It was later revealed that over a two-day period Dirkhising had been repeatedly raped and sodomized with various objects. After the men took a break to eat, Brown noticed Dirkhising was not breathing and alerted Carpenter, who attempted to resuscitate the boy, then called 911. Dirkhising later died in the hospital, his death hastened apparently as the result of positional asphyxia.

Police found in Carpenter's home material of a pedophilic nature, including instructions on how to sedate a child, and a diagram of how to tie up and position the boy, as well as other notes of fantasies of molesting children. It was speculated that one of the men planned the assault and the other carried it out. The Arkansas State Police recorded in their affidavit a statement by Brown that he had been molesting Dirkhising for at least two months prior to Dirkhising's death. Brown called the molestation 'horseplay' and claimed that Dirkhising was a willing participant. According to age of consent laws in Arkansas, Dirkhising was incapable of giving informed consent for sexual activity. Brown also later claimed he himself was "under the influence of methamphetamine" when talking with his arresting officers.

== Media coverage ==
Dirkhising's case initially was reported regionally by "news organizations in Arkansas and also covered by newspapers in Oklahoma and Tennessee," yet almost no national press. The Associated Press ran the story on its local wires but not nationally until a month later when the story was focused on the lack of coverage rather than the crime itself. A LexisNexis search revealed only a few dozen articles that appeared only after The Washington Times story on the lack of coverage on October 22, 1999, a month after Dirkhising's death.

=== Accusations of liberal media bias ===
On October 22, 1999, approximately one month after his death, The Washington Times ran a story with the headline "Media tune out torture death of Arkansas boy." The story contrasted the lack of coverage of the Dirkhising case with the treatment the murder of Matthew Shepard received. The story quoted Tim Graham, director of media studies at Media Research Center, a conservative media watchdog group that frequently criticizes liberal bias, as saying, "Nobody wants to say anything negative about homosexuals. Nobody wants to be seen on the wrong side of that issue." Brent Bozell, media critic and director of the Media Research Center, accused the media of deliberately spiking the story. Bozell wrote, "Had he been openly gay and his attackers heterosexual, the crime would have led all the networks. But no liberal media outlet has as its villains two gay men."

After The Washington Times article, the lack of coverage of Dirkhising's case was noted by conservative commentators and was attributed to the homosexuality of the perpetrators as well as the nature of the crimes. Conservative political commentator Pat Buchanan noted that showing gay men as sadistic barbarians does not fit the "villain-victim script of our cultural elite."

The Dirkhising case was repeatedly compared with the media coverage of the murder of Matthew Shepard although Dirkhising was a minor in a sex crime and Shepard's murder was a hate crime involving adults. Also the sexualities of the victims and attackers differed somewhat, with Shepard being an openly gay man attacked by two heterosexual men, while Dirkhising's attackers were lovers and presumed to be gay.

Jonathan Gregg wrote in Time, "Matthew Shepard died not because of an all-too-common sex crime, but because of prejudice. Essentially, Shepard was lynched; taken from a bar, beaten and left to die because he was the vilified "other" whom society has often cast as an acceptable target of abuse; Dirkhising was just "another" to a pair of deviants. And while child abuse is unfortunately no big news, lynching still is."

In the month after Shepard's murder, LexisNexis recorded 3,007 stories about his death compared with only 46 in the month after the Dirkhising murder. However, once the media seized on the story, this count rapidly rose into the thousands. Many of the articles justified the lack of coverage, citing that the death did not justify national attention; initial reports failed to mention that the two perpetrators were gay, whereas the Shepard reports identified Shepard as gay and the crimes as hate crimes from the beginning. In a November 4, 1999, Time magazine article, Jonathan Gregg opined that accusations of liberal media bias were not justified because the two cases varied, with the Dirkhising murder offering "no lessons," whereas the Shepard murder "touches on a host of complex and timely issues: intolerance, society's attitudes toward gays and the pressure to conform, [and] the use of violence as a means of confronting one's demons."

=== Accusations of homophobia ===
Commentator Andrew Sullivan wrote an article in The New Republic accusing the liberal media of political correctness and using Dirkhising's death to attack the Human Rights Campaign for its support of hate-crime legislation. The Human Rights Campaign (HRC), however, complained that The Washington Times "omitted a key piece of information" for its front-page story on Dirkhising: The HRC had provided a statement strongly condemning the crime and called for the perpetrators to be punished "to the fullest extent of the law." Sullivan also criticized some aspects of the conservative coverage of the Dirkhising case equating gay sex with child molestation as "ugly nonsense". Sullivan squarely summed up the differences in media coverage as being due to political interests. Sullivan stated that whereas the Shepherd case was used to support including LGBTQ people in federal hate-crime law, the Dirkhising case was ignored due to concerns of inciting anti-gay prejudice. In November 1999, E. R. Shipp, ombudsman at The Washington Post, noted that "readers, prodded by commentators who are hostile to LGBTQ people and to what they view as a 'liberal' press" had raised questions about the Dirkhising case. Shipp said, however, that she "made a clear distinction" between the Dirkhising and Shepard cases: "Matthew Shepard's death sparked public expressions of outrage that themselves became news. . . . That Jesse Dirkhising's death has not done so is hardly the fault of The Washington Post." Shipp also noted that the Shepherd story was newsworthy because of the debate it fostered on hate crimes and the level of intolerance towards LGBT people in the United States.

The story of the September 26 death was transmitted by Associated Press national news wires on October 29, and the Post ran a news brief the following day.

Jonathan Gregg, in a November 9 Time magazine editorial, asserted that "[the killing of Dirkhising] was the kind of depraved act that happens with even more regularity against young females and, indeed if the victim had been a 13-year-old girl, the story would probably never have gotten beyond Benton County, much less Arkansas. The same editorial also said: "A red herring worth addressing at the outset is the failure to distinguish between homosexuality and pedophilia, which creates a false parallel at the core of The Washington Times argument. But sex with children is a crime regardless of the sexes involved, and is not synonymous with homosexuality. . . . "The reason the Dirkhising story received so little play is [that] it offered no lessons. Shepard's murder touches on a host of complex and timely issues: intolerance, society's attitudes toward gays and the pressure to conform, [and] the use of violence as a means of confronting one's demons. Jesse Dirkhising's death gives us nothing except the depravity of two sick men."

== Trials and convictions ==
Davis Don Carpenter and Joshua Brown were each charged with capital murder and six counts of rape, and they faced the death penalty in Arkansas for the crimes. Neither man had any known prior convictions. The two men were tried separately, as it was believed "each of them will blame the other for the murder." The Arkansas state prosecutor "maintained that the older man had mapped out the assault and watched a portion of it" so chose to send Brown to trial first. Carpenter's court-appointed attorney, criminal defense lawyer Tim Buckley, sought a change of venue from Benton County citing excessive pretrial publicity. "It's been on everyone's lips down here for a month and a half," Buckley stated. The Washington Post was "almost alone among national newspapers" reporting on Brown's trial and Fox News was the only network to cover the murder trial and conviction. The prosecutors "argued that Jesse suffocated to death during the sexual assault because of a combination of the drugs and the way he was trussed up." In March 2001, Brown was found guilty of first-degree murder and rape. He was sentenced to life in prison, and this sentence was upheld on appeal by the Arkansas Supreme Court in September 2003. In April 2001, Carpenter pleaded guilty to similar charges and was also sentenced to life. Subsequently, Carpenter said on the Fox News Channel that Brown was solely responsible for the rape and murder of Dirkhising while Brown said that Carpenter was the director.

As of 2013 Carpenter, Arkansas Department of Corrections (ADC)#120443 is in the Tucker Maximum Security Unit. He entered the state prison system on April 26, 2001. As of 2013 Joshua Macave Brown, ADC#120142, is located in the East Arkansas Regional Unit. He had been received into the state prison system on April 4, 2001.

== See also ==
- Cultural depictions of Matthew Shepard
