= Long rider =

Long rider may refer to:

- Equestrian who rides long distances, usually on long-distance trails
- Adult hunt seat rider
- "Long Rider", a song by Pixies, from the 2019 album Beneath the Eyrie
- Long Riders (professional wrestling), the original of the professional wrestling tag team The Smoking Gunns
- The Long Riders, a 1980 American Western film
- Long Riders!, a Japanese manga series

== See also ==
- The Long Ryders, an American alternative country band
- Long line rider
