= Randall L. Williams =

American politician (1924–2010)

Randall L. Williams (June 7, 1924 – December 24, 2010), was an Arkansas politician who represented Drew County, Arkansas, in the Arkansas House of Representatives, and later served as an Arkansas circuit judge for the 11th District from 1970 to 1993, with duties in Arkansas, Jefferson, Desha, and Lincoln counties.

Born in Pleasant Hill, Louisiana, Randall attended Dermott High School, and received an undergraduate degree from the University of Arkansas at Monticello, followed by a Juris Doctor from the University of Arkansas in Fayetteville. Williams served in the United States Army in post-World War II Japan, from 1947 to 1948. He was admitted to practice law in 1950.

Williams was the chairperson of the board of the Arkansas Department of Corrections (ADC) from 1993 to 2000, and the Randall L. Williams Correctional Facility west of Pine Bluff, Arkansas, in Jefferson County was named for him in April 2008.
