= Barbara Ester Unit =

Prison in Arkansas, United States

Coordinates: 34.222°N 92.083°W

- Interactive map of Barbara Ester Unit
- Location: Pine Bluff, Arkansas
- Status: Operational
- Managed by: Arkansas Department of Correction

Location of Pine Bluff in Arkansas, and Pine Bluff in Jefferson County

Barbara A. Ester Unit is a correctional facility of the Arkansas Department of Correction (ADC), located in Pine Bluff, Arkansas. It is scheduled to have a capacity of 580 prisoners, and it is the first prison in the ADC dedicated to the re-entry of prisoners into society. In addition to prisoners who are to be released within six months, it also houses prisoners who were incarcerated due to disobeying the rules of their parole. The prison's namesake is Barbara Ester, a prison guard holding the rank corporal at the East Arkansas Unit. She died on January 20, 2012, at the hands of a prisoner.

== History ==
It was previously known as the Diagnostic Unit. In 2015, the Ester Unit began to receive prisoners. The prison's dedication as the Ester Unit occurred in August 2016; at that time, its capacity was temporarily 380 prisoners.

In December 2016, the ADC announced that it would move about 175 prisoners from the Pulaski County Jail's Wrightsville Annex to the Ester Unit; the Wrightsville Annex held prisoners soon to be released and parole violators, and the ADC stated it did not have the necessary funds to operate both Ester and the Wrightsville annex. The Ester Unit's construction was scheduled to finish in late March 2017.

== Programs ==
The prison has a dedicated barracks for military veterans who have prison sentences. There is a General Education Development (GED) program and the "Preparing for Success" program, a re-entry program which uses the National Institute of Corrections Thinking for a Change (T4C) curriculum. There is also a Workforce Alliance for Growth in the Economy (WAGE) Program and a Vocational Training Program, which provide workplace training to inmates. The Advanced Principles and Applications for Life (APAL) Program grew to include the Barbara Ester Unit in 2017, and provides religious services.
