= Randall L. Williams Correctional Facility =

Prison in Arkansas, United States

Coordinates: 34°13′19″N 92°04′40″W

- Interactive map of Randall L. Williams Correctional Facility
- Location: Pine Bluff, Arkansas
- Status: open
- Capacity: 576
- Opened: 1990
- Managed by: Arkansas Department of Correction

The Randall L. Williams Correctional Facility is a prison of the Arkansas Department of Corrections (ADC) located in the "Pine Bluff Complex" in Pine Bluff, Arkansas. The 576-bed facility sits on a 10-acre (4.0 ha) plot of land.

The facility previously served as the Jefferson County Jail. Around 2008 the county opened the new W. C. "Dub" Brassel Adult Detention Facility and vacated the previous county jail. ADC purchased the former jail in 2008 and renamed it the Williams Correctional Facility in April of that year, after Randall L. Williams, a former state representative for Drew County and thereafter from 1970 to 1993 a Jefferson County circuit judge.

Williams was the chairperson of the board of ADC from 1993 to 2000. ADC uses the facility as additional intake space, and after ADC acquired the facility, it moved the special management barracks, a unit for prisoners with counseling and mental health requirements, to Williams from the Cummins Unit.
