= Varner Unit =

High-security state prison in Arkansas

Coordinates: 34°02′32″N 91°36′27″W

- Interactive map of Varner Unit
- Location: Varner, Arkansas
- Status: open
- Security class: close, maximum, super maximum
- Capacity: 1714
- Opened: 1987
- Managed by: Arkansas Department of Corrections

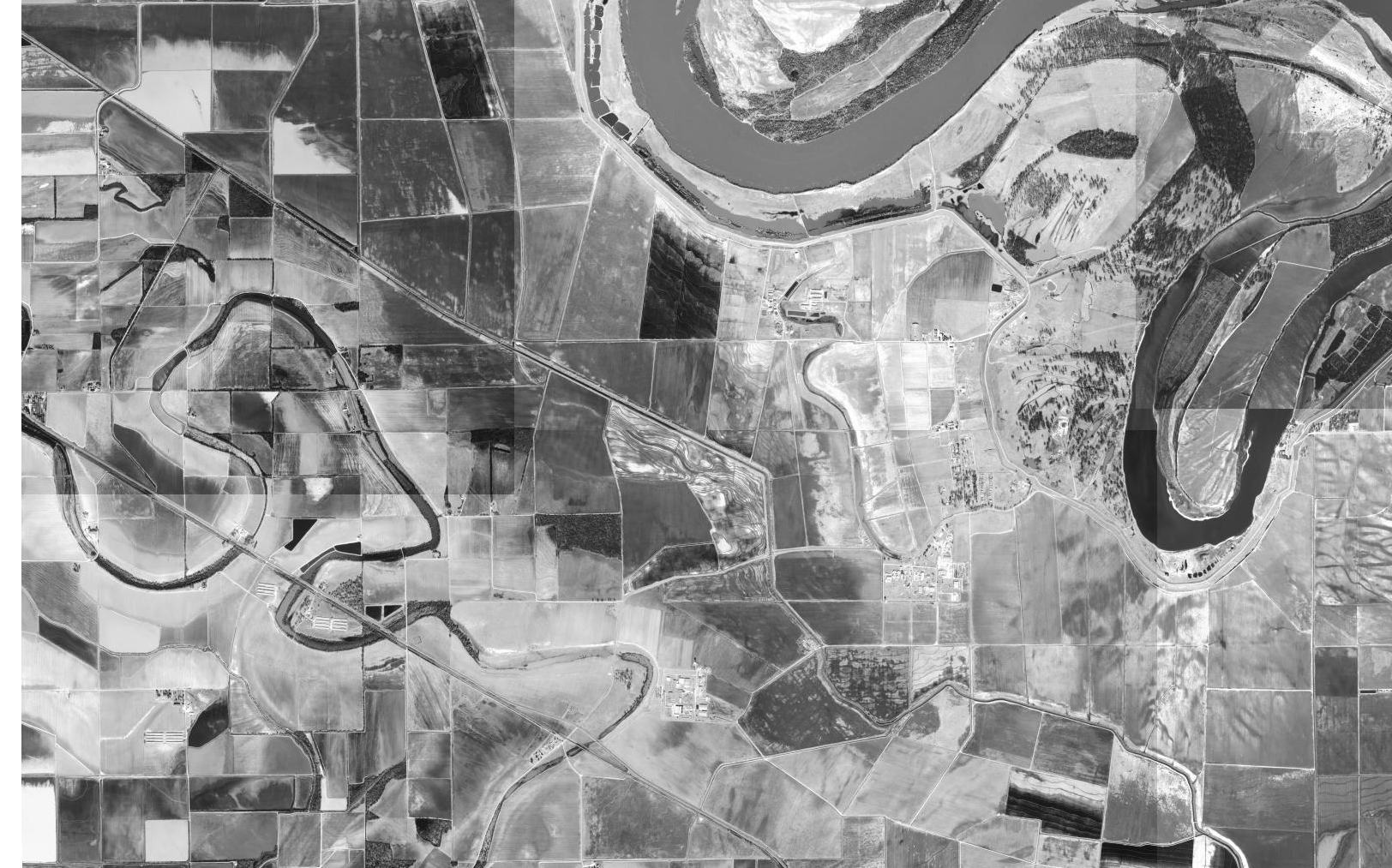
Aerial view of the Varner and Cummins units, U.S. Geological Survey, February 28, 2001

The Varner Unit is a high-security state prison for men of the Arkansas Department of Corrections in Varner, Choctaw Township, unincorporated Lincoln County, Arkansas, United States. It is located along U.S. Highway 65, near Grady, and 28 miles (45 km) south of Pine Bluff. The prison can house over 1,600 prisoners, and it includes a 468-bed supermax (Super Maximum Security) facility. The supermax and non-supermax facilities are separate from one another.

The Varner Unit Supermax houses male inmates scheduled for execution in Arkansas, currently performed by lethal injection. The actual executions take place at the nearby Cummins Unit. The female death row is located at the McPherson Unit. Varner is one of the state of Arkansas's "parent units" for male prisoners; it serves as one of several units of initial assignment for processed male prisoners.

== History ==
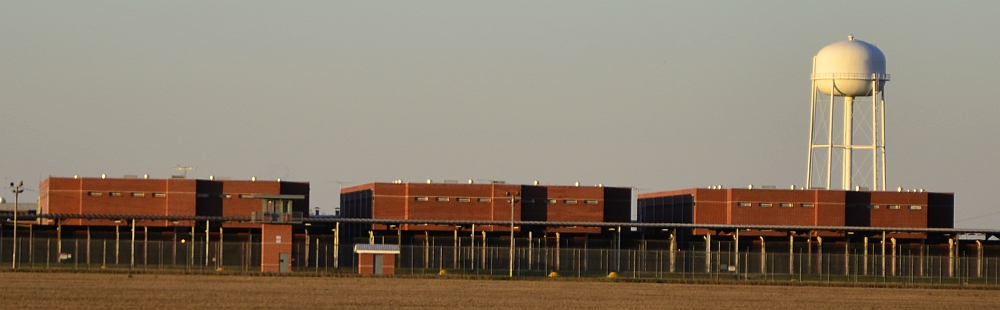
Varner Unit Supermax (2012)

The Varner Unit was opened in 1987 with 300 beds, and its capacity was soon increased to 700 beds. Further construction has brought the total capacity to over 1,600 prisoners. The supermax units opened in 2000, and federal grants paid 90% of the construction costs.

At one time the State of Arkansas housed all young male offenders in the state prison system in Varner. While this was the case, Correction Officers and prisoners nicknamed the facility the "Gladiator School."

On Friday August 22, 2003, all 39 Arkansas death row inmates were moved from the Maximum Security Unit to the Supermax at the Varner Unit.

In 2011, a fight among prisoners and correctional officers led to injuries among correctional officers.

During 2004/2005, ADC installed an electric fence between two non-electric fences in the Varner Unit. It received testing in late December 2004 and was activated in January 2005. The system used inmate labor to assist with the construction of the fence.

On September 11, 2025, an inmate was shot twice by a correctional officer at Varner. The spokesperson said that the inmate, who was on field duty, attempted to flee the area. A correctional officer fired two shots, striking the inmate. He was taken to a nearby hospital in an unknown condition.

== Composition ==
The property is in Choctaw Township.

== Operations ==
Varner houses a vegetable processing plant.

The main campus of the Riverside Vocational Technical School is located behind the Varner Unit.

== Prisoner life ==
=== Education ===
In 2011, a campus of the Mid-America Baptist Theological Seminary was established in the prison.

== Notable inmates ==
=== Current ===
- Zachary Holly: convicted and sentenced to death for the murder of Jersey Bridgeman.
- Randy Gay: convicted and sentenced to death for murdering someone while having two prior convictions for murder.
- Karl Roberts: convicted and sentenced to death for the murder of Andria Brewer.
- Abdulhakim Mujahid Muhammad: perpetrator of the Little Rock recruiting office shooting.
- Grant Hardin: convicted and sentenced for murder and rape, a former police chief of Gateway, Arkansas and former officer for three Northwest Arkansas area police departments. Hardin previously escaped North Central Unit prison on May 25, 2025 by disguising himself as a guard before being transferred.
- Travis Eugene Posey: perpetrator of the 2024 Fordyce shooting.

=== Former ===
Death row:

- Damien Echols: member of the West Memphis Three (released on August 19, 2011).

Non-death row

- Jessie Misskelley: member of the West Memphis Three (released on August 19, 2011).
- Jason Baldwin: member of the West Memphis Three (released on August 19, 2011).
