= Benton Unit =

Prison in Arkansas, United States

- Interactive map of Benton Unit
- Location: 34.523°N 92.655°W
- Status: Operational
- Opened: 1990
- Managed by: Arkansas Department of Correction

Location of Benton in Saline County, and Saline County in Arkansas

The Benton Unit is a prison located in Benton, Arkansas. It is managed by the Arkansas Department of Corrections. It was founded in 1974.
