= Tom Murton =

American activist

- Born: Thomas O. Murton; March 15, 1928
- Died: October 10, 1990 (aged 62); Oklahoma City, United States
- Education: University of California, Berkeley
- Occupation: Penologist

Thomas O. Murton (March 15, 1928 – October 10, 1990) was a penologist best known for his wardenship of the prison farms of Arkansas. In 1969, he published an account of the endemic corruption there which created a national scandal, and which was popularized in a fictional version by the film Brubaker.

== Personal life ==
Tom Murton was born in 1928. His parents were E.T. Murton and Bessie Glass Stevens. He was married to Margaret E. Conway and had four children, Marquita (Marquita Schendel), Teresa (Teresa Kress), Melanie (Melanie Sandstrom) and Mark Murton.

Murton died of cancer at the age of 62 on October 10, 1990, at a Veterans Affairs Hospital in Oklahoma City. Both of his parents and the four children survived him.

== Education and penological views ==
Before his career as a penologist, Murton attained a bachelor's degree in animal husbandry from Oklahoma State University in 1950. He earned a degree in mathematics at Fairbanks, Alaska between 1957 and 1958 with benefits under the GI bill. He enrolled in the University of California, Berkeley in 1964 and completed a Master of Arts Degree in criminology and satisfied residency requirements for a doctorate in 1966. After he was dismissed from the Arkansas correctional system in 1968, he completed a doctoral degree in criminology at the University of California, Berkeley.

According to his obituary in The New York Times,

Mr. Murton's ideas on prison reform included treating prisoners with respect, abolishing corporal punishment, providing better food and rooting out extortion and other rackets among the inmates. Vehemently opposed to the death penalty, he dismantled the electric chair at Cummins. He also opposed life sentences. "When you sentence a man to life in prison, with no chance of getting out, he's going to die one day at a time because he knows he's doomed to walk the halls of purgatory for as long as he's alive," he once told an interviewer.

== Career ==
Murton had helped establish the correctional system of the new state of Alaska during the 1960s.

He was teaching at Southern Illinois University when he was hired to reform the Arkansas prison system in 1968. He wrote about his experiences there (with co-author Joe Hyams) in Accomplices to the Crime: The Arkansas Prison Scandal, published in 1969 by Grove Press. He was unable to find work in the correctional industry after that, and believed he had been blackballed for his work in Arkansas.

From 1971 to 1979, he taught at the University of Minnesota. In 1980, he left full-time teaching and returned to farming, raising wheat and ducks on his mother's farm in Deer Creek, Oklahoma. He occasionally taught courses in Corrections in the early to mid-1980s as an adjunct professor at San Jose State University and Chaminade University of Honolulu, which were affiliated at the time in their Criminal Justice programs. He was professor of sociology, Oklahoma State University, in 1985. He died in Deer Creek in 1990.

In 1976, he wrote his second book on penal reform, The Dilemma of Prison Reform, published by Holt, Rinehart and Winston. He self-published a third book, Crime and Punishment in Arkansas – Adventures in Wonderland in 1985, published in Stillwater, Oklahoma.

== Prison scandal ==
=== Hired to end corruption ===
In the 1960s, Arkansas maintained two large prison farms: the Tucker State Prison Farm and Cummins State Prison Farm. The farms used over a thousand inmates as forced labor to produce profits which annually "averaged about $1,400,000 over the years...".

In 1967, Arkansas inaugurated a new governor to follow Orval Faubus, who had held that office for twelve years (six terms). State Governor Winthrop Rockefeller released a report on the state prison system which had been ordered and then suppressed by Faubus. The 67-page report detailed horrific conditions at the two state penal farms, including endemic sexual assault, electrical torture, flogging, beatings with blackjacks and hoses, extortion of money from other inmates by the armed prisoners who were working as "trusty" guards (due to the absence of a salaried guard force), open marketing of illegal drugs and alcohol, and a host of other malicious and criminal practices. Particularly ironic, as well as harsh, was the poor quality and quantity of food given to the prisoners—on a farm which marketed enough produce and dairy products to produce profits that were averaging $1.4 million (US) in 1960s dollars (more than $13,520,000 in current dollars).

In his own later writings about Tucker, Murton noted the cruelty of the "trustees":

Discipline was routinely enforced by flogging, beating with clubs, inserting of needles under fingernails, crushing of testicles with pliers, and the last word in torture devices: the "Tucker telephone," an instrument used to send an electric current through genitals.

In 1967, along with releasing the Faubus report, Rockefeller sought to reform the system by bringing in Murton, who had made his reputation by helping establish the Alaskan correctional system after that territory achieved statehood in 1959. Murton, then 39 years old, was chosen to be the first professional penologist the state of Arkansas had ever hired as a warden.

In early February 1968, Murton ordered excavations on the grounds of the Cummins prison farm. Three bodies were uncovered before the excavation was halted, although 15 to 25 depressions were clearly visible. Murton's inmate informant told him that as many as 200 bodies had been buried there; also, the number of prisoners listed as "escapees" since 1915 was reported as "more than 200".

According to the informant, Reuben Johnson, most of the men had been killed after refusing extortion demands from the "trusty" guards. Their deaths were either falsely recorded as successful escapes, or recorded as deaths, but under false pretenses. Johnson, a lifer, gave details of murders and burials on the prison grounds dating back for decades, including a mass murder of about 20 inmates around Labor Day of 1940. Johnson was backed up by at least one other inmate, James Wilson. Wilson also asserted that returning escapees were routinely murdered.

=== Fired to end exposure ===
The Rockefeller administration, though not directly implicated in crimes which took place before 1967, was deeply embarrassed by the national attention drawn to the brutality Murton revealed. Claims were made that the bodies must have been from a nearby potters field, a cemetery for the poor. However, as Time noted in February 1968, the cemetery in question was over a mile away from where Murton found the bodies, at least one of which was positively identified as prisoner Joe Jackson, buried by Reuben Johnson on Christmas Eve, 1946.

The skeletons were turned over to another arm of state government, the University of Arkansas Medical Center. At the time, Governor Rockefeller stated his intention to withhold details of the investigation from the public until the Arkansas state police issued a report of their findings, incorporating the university's results. Rockefeller was quoted nationwide when he said that there could be no point in "washing dirty linen for weeks on end as each body is dug up".

Murton's agitation eventually disrupted the Rockefeller administration to the extent that not only was he fired two months after the bodies were exhumed, he was told he had twenty-four hours to get out of the state, or be arrested for grave-robbing—a charge with a sentence of twenty-one years, under Arkansas law at that time. He left.

Murton was dismissed in early spring 1968, less than a year after his 1967 hire. Governor Rockefeller claimed that Murton's excavations had become a "sideshow". The governor halted the excavations after the first three bodies were found. The official report by the Rockefeller administration, written by the Arkansas state police, took the position that the bodies must have been from the paupers' cemetery—although the cemetery was a mile away from where the bodies were located.

Murton's book about the scandalous conditions was released the next year, 1969, and the Redford movie was released eleven years later, in 1980 (see Brubaker).

=== Later career ===
Murton's career as a correctional administrator was over. In 1969 he founded the Murton Foundation for Criminal Justice, incorporated in Alaska in 1969. He served as its president from 1969 to at least 1985.

In 1982, Murton shared with students in a criminal justice graduate seminar course at the University of Central Oklahoma that he was "blackballed" by the "correctional community". To make a living, he started and maintained a duck farm north of Oklahoma City, where he lived until his death.

Dr. William Parker, then department chair over the criminal justice program and subsequently the assistant dean, invited Murton to teach at the University of Central Oklahoma in the mid-1980s. He returned to academia for the next several years, including a short stint teaching criminology and corrections at Oklahoma State University in the mid-1980s. Murton continued to maintain his duck farm until his death in late 1990.

== Film ==
The book written by Murton and Hyams was published in 1969. In 1980, a fictionalized film treatment starring Robert Redford as "Warden Henry Brubaker" was released to wide acclaim, earning an Oscar nomination. Although the dramatic opening of the film, in which Brubaker impersonates an inmate in order to see the system literally "from inside" before taking up the warden's post, was a fabrication, much of the movie's drama was taken directly from the book.

The fabricated prisoner-impersonation device may have been inspired by Thomas Mott Osborne, a former warden at Sing Sing, who had had himself committed to Auburn Penitentiary in 1913 under an assumed name.

== Song ==
In 1968, the popular singer Bobby Darin wrote and recorded "Long Line Rider", a song which described the incident, on his album Bobby Darin Born Walden Robert Cassotto. Some of its lyrics were: "There's a farm in Arkansas, got some secrets in its floor, in decay, in decay. You can tell where they're at, nothing grows, the ground is flat, where they lay, where they lay." It also includes the line "This kind of thing can't happen here, especially not in election year." Darin was due to perform the song on The Jackie Gleason Show, but when they ordered him to cut that particular line, rather than censor himself, he walked off the set.

== Publications ==
- Accomplices To the Crime, 1969, Grove Press, Inc., New York, NY
- (with Phyllis Jo Baunach) "Shared Decision-Making in Prison Management: a Survey of Demonstrations Involving the Inmate in Participatory Government". In: Michele G. Hermann/Marilyn G.Haft (Hrsg.) Prisoners' Rights Sourcebook. Theory, Litigation, Practice. New York 1973, pp. 543–573.
- The Dilemma of Prison Reform. New York 1976

== See also ==
- Factor 8: The Arkansas Prison Blood Scandal
