= Arkansas Department of Corrections =

American government agency

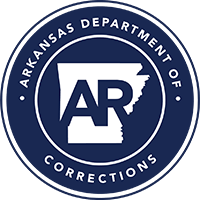

Agency overview
- Formed: Reorganized 2019
- Preceding agencies: Arkansas Department of Correction (1968-2019), Arkansas Department of Community Corrections (1993-2019); Arkansas State Penitentiary
- Jurisdiction: State of Arkansas
- Headquarters: 1302 Pike Avenue, Ste. C North Little Rock, AR 72114
- Employees: ▼4,513
- Annual budget: ▲US$618,305,804
- Agency executives: Secretary; Lindsay Wallace
- Parent agency: Arkansas Board of Corrections
- Child agency: Arkansas Correctional School
- Key document: Amendment 33, A.C.A. § 12-27-105
- Website: https://doc.arkansas.gov/

The Arkansas Department of Corrections (DOC), formerly the Arkansas Department of Correction, is the state law enforcement agency that oversees inmates and operates state prisons within the U.S. state of Arkansas. DOC consists of two divisions, the Arkansas Division of Corrections (ADC) and the Arkansas Division of Community Corrections (DCC), as well as the Arkansas Correctional School District. ADC is responsible for housing and rehabilitating people convicted of crimes by the courts of Arkansas. ADC maintains 20 prison facilities for inmates in 12 counties. DCC is responsible for adult parole and probation and offender reentry.

The Department of Corrections was officially organized as a cabinet-level state agency in 2019, but traces history back to the first state penitentiary in 1838. Early efforts focused on convict leasing, though the program largely ended toward the end of the 19th century after abuses were exposed, and prisoners were housed in "The Walls" prison in Little Rock until 1933. Arkansas next transitioned to the prison farm system, establishing the Cummins State Farm and Tucker Farm in South Arkansas. Underfunded and mostly operated by so-called 'trusties' (inmates); corrupt and dangerous conditions plagued Arkansas prisons for decades, culminating in several reform efforts throughout the 1960s and 1970s, including the creation of the first modern incarnation of the ADC in 1967.

In 1993, Arkansas created the Department of Community Punishment (DCP), which would evolve into the DCC. Arkansas briefly contracted with a private prison between 1998 and 2001; inmate conditions were unsafe and unsanitary and the United States Department of Justice ruled Arkansas' private prison unconstitutional in 2003.

== History ==
Arkansas became a state in 1836. The first Governor of Arkansas, James S. Conway, pushed the Arkansas General Assembly to allocate funds for a state penitentiary in their first meeting, but he met strong resistance with many of his proposals, and a penitentiary was not funded. The Second General Assembly in 1838 allocated $20,000 ($605,000 today) to a state penitentiary in Little Rock. The state purchased a 92.41-acre (37.40 ha) tract outside of Little Rock in 1839, and the Third General Assembly allocated another $40,500 ($1,306,000 today) in 1840 to finish construction of the Arkansas State Penitentiary. It held 300 prisoners. It was destroyed in 1846 in a prisoner revolt.

From 1849 to 1893 the State of Arkansas leased its convicted felons to private individuals. After abuses became publicized, the state assumed direct control of felons. The state continued to have prison labor be hired to contractors, manufacturers, and planters until 1913.

In 1899, the penitentiary site was selected for the new Arkansas State Capitol, which supplanted the Old State House. In the interim, Arkansas leased many convicts to companies, including the Arkansas Brick Manufacturing Company, for as long as ten years in an effort to house them while a new prison was built. Though officials agreed on the need to purchase a prison farm, widespread disagreement about the new prison's location stalled progress further. Governor Jeff Davis vetoed a plan to purchase the Sunnyside Plantation in February 1901. Further trying to make his case for more sweeping penal reform, Governor Davis toured the convict-leasing camp in England, Arkansas and revealed shocking allegations of inhumane treatment. The political battle consumed state politics for the next year. The General Assembly decided to purchase the Cummins Farm over the objection of Governor Davis, who preferred a location in Altheimer. However, ending the convict-lease system would remain an issue in state politics for the next 10 years.

A new prison was simultaneously constructed on a new 15-acre (6.1 ha) site southwest of Little Rock. Nicknamed "The Walls", the new prison opened in 1910. In 1913 act 55, signed into law, lead to the establishment of a permanent execution chamber in the state prison system. In 1916 the state purchased the land which became the Tucker Unit. In 1933 Junius Marion Futrell, then the governor, closed the penitentiary in Little Rock and transferred the prisoners to Cummins and Tucker, and the execution chamber was moved to Tucker.

In 1943 the state established the State Penitentiary Board through Act 1. In 1951 the state established the State Reformatory for Women through Act 351. The state moved the functions of the Arkansas State Training School for Girls to the state prison system.

=== Legal challenges begin ===
Discipline was routinely enforced by flogging, beating with clubs, inserting of needles under fingernails, crushing of testicles with pliers, and the last word in torture devices: the "Tucker telephone," an instrument used to send an electric current through genitals

-- Tom Murton

By the 1960s, Arkansas was infamous for operating one of the most corrupt and dangerous prison systems in the nation. Both Cummins and Tucker relied on the trusty system, which created a hierarchy of prisoners, with some designated as 'trusties' who the guards trusted with many of the day-to-day duties. The Tucker Telephone was a torture device designed using parts from an old-fashioned crank telephone used to apply an electric shock to an uncooperative prisoner's genitals at Tucker. Atrocious conditions in the prison system had long been known about in Arkansas, but rose in prominence during the 1960s.

In 1965, Federal Judge J. Smith Henley ruled in favor of Cummins inmates in Talley v. Stephens, (Note: The superintendent at Cummins was Dan D. Stephens.) who sued claiming they were unconstitutionally subjected to cruel and unusual punishments and denied access to the courts and medical care. Henley ordered the prison stop forcing prisoners to work beyond their physical ability, cease arbitrary use of corporal punishment by "blows with a leather strap", and to allow access to medical care and legal resources without fear or reprisals. The case initiated a long legal saga that would eventually lead to major reforms in Arkansas prisons.

Governor Orval Faubus ordered a study of conditions at Tucker, but suppressed the report when it found torture, violence, rape, corruption and graft widespread by both trusties and prison officials. The report also found "To make profits, the prisoners were driven remorselessly from dawn to dusk in the fields, especially at harvest time". Both farms were operated to generate revenues to the state. A 1968 Time article entitled "Hell in Arkansas" found the two farms "averaged" profits of "about $1,400,000 over the years..." ($13 million today) using prisoners as forced labor.

=== Department founding 1967 and early history ===
Winthrop Rockefeller, running on a good government platform, released the previously suppressed report publicly upon election to the Governor's office in 1967. Rockefeller succeeded in reorganizing the penitentiary system into the Arkansas Department of Correction through Act 50 in the 66th Arkansas General Assembly. The ADC assumed control over the Tucker State Prison Farm for younger white prisoners, and the 1,300-inmate Cummins Farm for "white and black adult inmates". Rockefeller hired the first professional penologist, Tom Murton, as prison superintendent in 1967. On January 29, 1968, Murton invited the media to witness the unearthing of three decayed skeletal remains in a remote part of the 16,000-acre grounds of the Cummins prison farm. They believed the skeletons were those of prisoners murdered at Cummins, although this was never proven. Fired after less than a year, Murton's aggressive approach to uncovering Arkansas' prison scandal with its decades-long systemic corruption, embarrassed Rockefeller and "infuriated conservative politicians". Murton had attracted nationwide media attention and contempt for Arkansas, as news of Bodiesburg, as it was called, spread. Murton's co-authored 1969 book, Accomplices to the Crime: The Arkansas Prison Scandal was the basis for the fictionalized 1980 film Brubaker starring Robert Redford.

In Holt v. Sarver, Judge Henley ruled several aspects of Arkansas's prison system unconstitutional and provided guidelines to get the system into compliance. The following year, Henley found the entire prison system operated by the ADC unconstitutional, as issues restricting inmates' access to court and cruel and unusual punishment remained in violation of his previous ruling. A 1969 case challenging many aspects of the ADC prison system lasted almost a decade, resulting in the Supreme Court landmark case Hutto v. Finney 437 U.S. 678 (437 U.S. 678 (1978)). The case also clarified prison system's unacceptable punitive measures. T. Don Hutto had been hired by Governor Dale Bumpers in 1971 as the head of the Arkansas Department of Correction, with a mandate of "humanizing" the "convict farms".

In 1974, Hutto resigned and moved to Virginia to become deputy director of the Virginia Department of Corrections.

=== Recent history ===
In 2014 the state made a call for cities to submit bids to host a new maximum security prison.

=== 2019 State government reorganization ===
Following state government reorganization in 2019, the State of Arkansas created the cabinet level Department of Corrections (DOC) as the umbrella department for several corrections-related state agencies. DOC oversees administrative functions for these several units, including the Division of Community Corrections (DCC), Arkansas Parole Board (APB), Arkansas Sentencing Commission (ASC), Arkansas Criminal Detention Facility Review Committee, and the Interstate Commission for Adult Offender Supervision.

The primary duties of the old ADC is now under the auspices of the Division of Corrections, with DCC becoming the Division of Community Corrections, with both reporting to the Secretary of Corrections, a cabinet-level position.

== Division of Correction ==
Arkansas Division of Correction
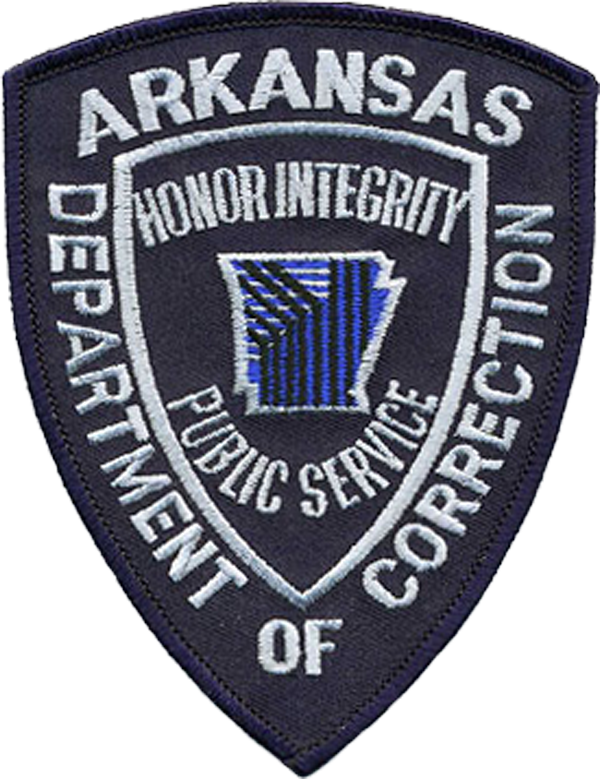
- Abbreviation: DOC

Agency overview
- Formed: 1968
- Preceding agency: Arkansas State Penitentiary
- Employees: 4000+

Jurisdictional structure
- Legal jurisdiction: Arkansas
- Governing body: Arkansas Board of Corrections
- Constituting instrument: Constitution of Arkansas
- General nature: Local civilian police

Operational structure
- Headquarters: 6814 Princeton Pike; Pine Bluff, AR 71602
- Agency executive: Dexter Payne, Director

Website
- https://doc.arkansas.gov/correction/

=== Headquarters ===
The headquarters are in Pine Bluff. The ADC headquarters moved to the Pine Bluff Complex in 1979. Previously they were located in the State Office Building in Little Rock.

=== Operations ===
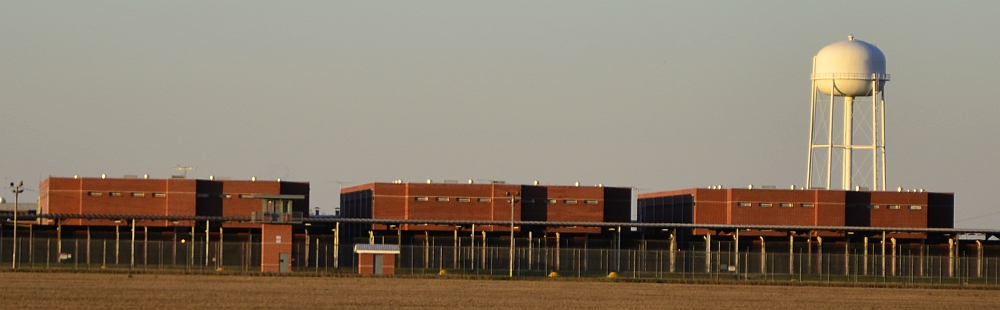
Varner Unit, one of the ADC parent units

For the diagnostic process, male inmates go to the Ouchita River Correctional Unit in Malvern, and women go to the McPherson Unit in Newport. Male death row inmates are housed at the Varner Super Max Unit while women with death sentences are received at McPherson. The death chamber is located at the Cummins Unit. Previously the Diagnostic Unit in Pine Bluff was the intake unit for male prisoners.

After the intake process, most inmates go to a "parent unit" for their initial assignment. The male parent units are Cummins, East Arkansas, Grimes, Tucker, and Varner. The McPherson Unit is the female parent unit. The initial assignments last for at least 60 days. Inmates may be moved to other units based on behavior, institutional needs, job availability, and available space.

The ADC operates the Willis H. Sargent Training Academy in England, Arkansas.

== Boards and Commissions ==
In Arkansas's shared services model of state government, the cabinet-level agencies assist boards and commissions who have an overlapping scope. DOC supports:

Boards

- Arkansas Board of Corrections
- Arkansas Parole Board

Commissions

- Arkansas Sentencing Commission

Committee

- Criminal Detention Facility Review Committee

Councils

- Arkansas State Council for the Interstate Commission for Adult Offender Supervision

=== Death row ===
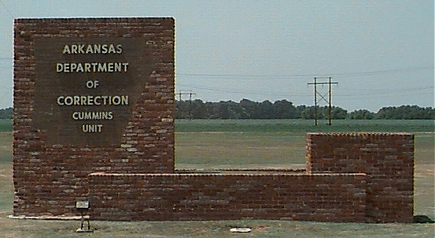
Cummins Unit serves as a parent unit for male prisoners and houses the State of Arkansas execution chamber

Male death row inmates are located at the Varner Unit's Supermax, while the executions are performed at the Cummins Unit, adjacent to Varner. The female death row is located at the McPherson Unit. In 1999 the female death row was newly inaugurated.

In 1974 male death row inmates, previously at the Tucker Unit, were moved to the Cummins Unit. In 1986 male death row inmates were moved to the Maximum Security Unit. On Friday August 22, 2003, all 39 Arkansas death row inmates, all of them male, were moved to the Supermax at the Varner Unit.

=== Demographics ===
As of June 3, 2015 the ADC has 18,681 prisoners. This is an increase from 1977, when it had 2,519 prisoners. After a parole violator was accused of committing a 2013 murder, the Arkansas Board of Corrections changed the conditions of parole, stating that any parolee accused of committing a felony must have his/her parole revoked, even if he/she has not yet been convicted of that felony. This caused the prison population to increase.

=== Prisons ===
Prisons include:

Facility	Capacity	Location
Barbara Ester Unit	580	off West 7th Avenue (Pine Bluff Complex) in Pine Bluff, Jefferson County
Benton Unit	325	off US 67 in Saline County, 5 miles (8 km) south of Benton
Cummins Unit	1725	off US 65 to Highway 388 in Lincoln County, 28 miles (45 km) south of Pine Bluff
Delta Regional Unit	599	off US 165 to East Gaines Street in Dermott, Chicot County, 50 miles (80 km) southeast of Pine Bluff
East Arkansas Regional Unit	1432	off Highway 131 near Brickeys, Lee County, 17 miles (27 km) southeast of Forrest City
Grimes Unit	1012	off Highway 384 in Newport, Jackson County
J. Aaron Hawkins Sr. Center	212	off Highway 365 to Highway 386 in Wrightsville, Pulaski County, 10 miles (16 km) south of Little Rock
Maximum Security Unit	532	off Highway 15 east of Tucker, Jefferson County, 25 miles (40 km) northeast of Pine Bluff
McPherson Unit	971	off Highway 384 in Newport, Jackson County
Mississippi County Work Release Center	121	off Meadow Road in Mississippi County, 1 mile (2 km) west of Luxora
North Central Unit	800	in Calico Rock, Izard County
Northwest Arkansas Work Release Center	100	in Springdale, Washington County
Ouachita River Unit	1782	off US 67 South in Malvern, Hot Spring County
Pine Bluff Unit	430	off West 7th Avenue (Pine Bluff Complex) in Pine Bluff, Jefferson County
Randall L. Williams Correctional Center	562	off West 7th Avenue (Pine Bluff Complex) in Pine Bluff, Jefferson County
Texarkana Regional Correction Center	128	off East 5th Street in Texarkana, Miller County
Tucker Unit	1126	off Highway 15 east of Tucker, Jefferson County, 25 miles (40 km) northeast of Pine Bluff
Varner Unit	1714	off US 65 to Highway 388 near Varner, Lincoln County, 28 miles (45 km) south of Pine Bluff
Willis H. Sargent Training Academy		England, Lonoke County
Wrightsville Unit	850	off Highway 365 to Highway 386 in Wrightsville, Pulaski County, 10 miles (16 km) south of Little Rock

=== Gallery ===
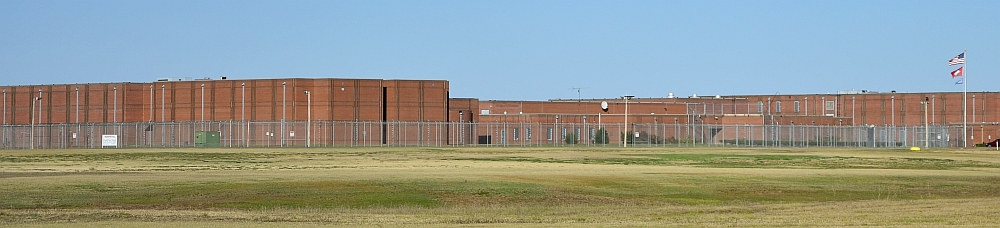
Maximum Security Unit

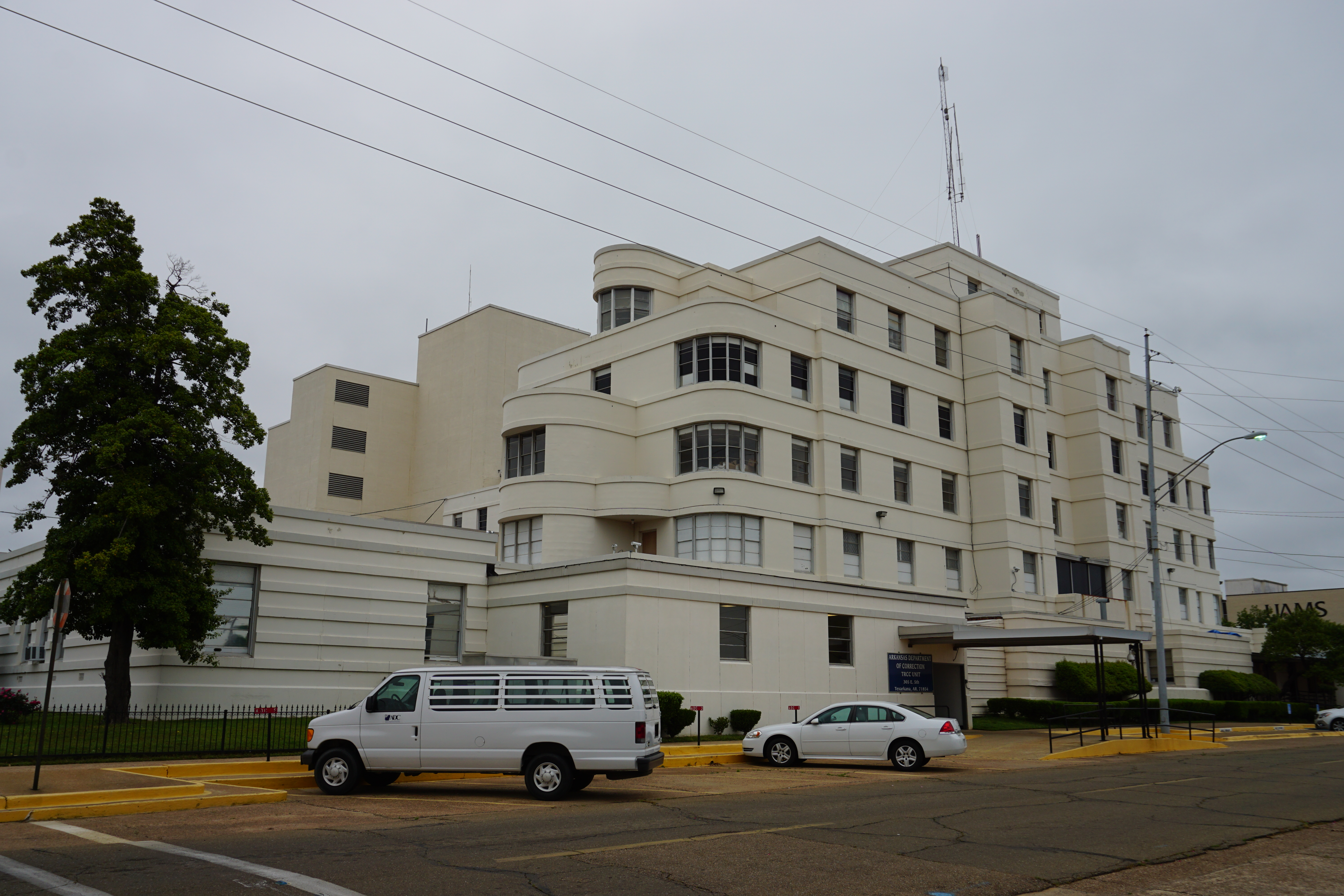
TRCC Unit in Texarkana

== Division of Community Corrections ==
The Division of Community Corrections (DCC) is the parole and community corrections state agency of Arkansas. ACC headquarters is located in North Little Rock.

=== Residential facilities ===
Facilities include:

- Central Arkansas Community Corrections Center (Little Rock)
- Northeast Arkansas Community Corrections Center (Osceola)
- Northwest Arkansas Community Corrections Center (Fayetteville)
- East Central Arkansas Community Corrections Center (West Memphis)
- Southwest Arkansas Community Corrections Center (Texarkana)
- Omega SSC (Unincorporated Hot Spring County, near Malvern)

== See also ==
- List of Arkansas state agencies
- List of law enforcement agencies in Arkansas
- List of U.S. state prisons
- List of United States state correction agencies
- Charles Laverne Singleton
- Factor 8: The Arkansas Prison Blood Scandal
- Arkansas Department of Human Services (operates juvenile correctional facilities)
