= North Central Unit =

Prison in Arkansas, United States

Coordinates: 36.1637°N 92.1520°W

- Interactive map of North Central Unit
- Status: Operational
- Opened: 1990
- Managed by: Arkansas Department of Correction

Location of Calico Rock in Izard County, and Izard County in Arkansas

The North Central Unit is a prison located in Calico Rock, Arkansas. It is managed by the Arkansas Department of Corrections.

== History ==
The North Central Unit, sometimes known as the Calico Rock Prison, was founded as a way to bring jobs to the area and to build a prison facility in the northern part of the state. At the time of its founding, local residents protested against the facility being built.

In 2010, the prison expanded to house an additional 100 beds.

On May 25, 2025, one of the inmates escaped from the facility dressed in an officer vest. The inmate, Grant Hardin, was a former Gateway, Arkansas police chief who previously served in three different law enforcement agencies in the 1990s, convicted of an unsolved rape case in November 1997 and a murder in February 2017, and had served a total of eight years of his 50-year prison sentence at the time of his escape. His escape lasted nearly two weeks until he was captured nearly two miles northwest of the prison in Calico Rock property. He was immediately transferred to Varner Unit following his capture.
