= Picana =

Electrical torture device

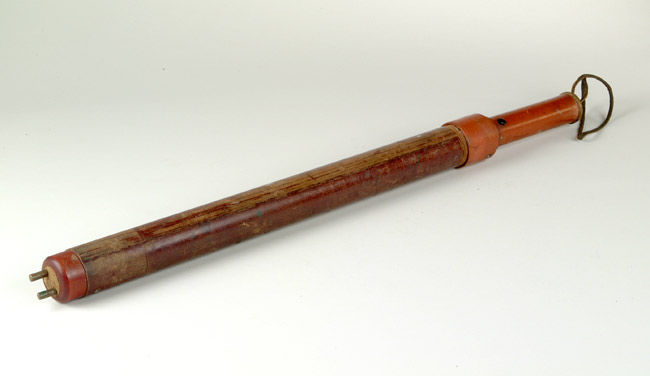
Electric cattle prod

The picana, picana eléctrica or chuzo eléctrico is a device used to give an electric shock during electrical torture.

== Description and use ==
The picana is a wand or prod that delivers a high voltage but low current electric shock to a torture victim. It has a bronze tip and an insulated handle, and is connected by wire to a control box with a rheostat to raise or reduce the voltage. Power is supplied by a car battery or by a transformer connected to a mains wall socket.

The victim is undressed and then tied to a chair or table or hung by wrists or upside down by the ankles. Often water is thrown over the victim to reduce the electrical resistance of the skin and to increase the effect of the shocks. Two people operate the picana. One adjusts the rheostat control to increase or decrease the voltage. The other holds the picana and applies its tip to sensitive places on the victim's naked body, such as the buttocks, armpits, legs, genitals, breasts and nipples.

The distinguishing feature of the picana is that the shocks are high voltage, but with limited energy per electric pulse. The high voltage means the shocks are ample but the low current means they are less likely to kill the victim, enabling longer torture sessions and many more shocks to be given than with higher current torture devices. According to an academic expert on torture, Darius Rejali of Reed College, early models of the picana used over 50 years ago delivered between 12,000 and 16,000 volts at a current of a thousandth of an amp. By comparison the Taser and other modern electric stun devices used by police forces deliver many times that voltage (which can deliver open-air voltages of 50,000 volts, although the voltage delivered to the victim is lower due to the resistance of air and clothing, averaging only 1,200 volts). As part of the usefulness of the picana arises from its high voltage, it is possible that more recent models use modern electronics for even higher voltage.

Precise details of the design are unclear. It is designed and manufactured specifically as a human torture device, the sale and use of which is illegal in most countries of the world. As it has no legitimate alternative use, the manufacturers and users of the picana do not publicise details of the devices.

The picana has a number of advantages as an instrument of torture:

- It is portable and can be used without complex installation, for example in anonymous surroundings or in the victim's home.
- It is cheap.
- The low current means the torturers can make a single session of torture last longer, in the hope that it will be more productive.
- The picana is easy to use – the control adjusts the severity of the shock and the prod enables the shock to be delivered precisely in the desired spot.

As with all types of torture, the picana has been used as often to frighten and intimidate as to extract information during interrogation.

== Origins ==
The picana is a hybrid electroshock weapon adapted from the electric cattle prod, the precursor for today's stun guns. Originally cattle prods were devices developed for use as a goad in animal slaughterhouses, but later were used on humans as torture devices intended to exact pain and incapacitate a person. The picana is reported as having been used in Buenos Aires, Argentina, from 1932 on. The device was a notorious innovation introduced by police chief Polo Lugones, son of the famous poet and novelist Leopoldo Lugones. Its use did not spread to other countries until the 1970s, when it was in use in Paraguay, Bolivia and Uruguay.

Electrical torture has been and is used in many countries. In South America, the picana appears to have been used routinely in Chile, along with other electrical tortures such as the parrilla in the 1970s and 1980s, during the dictatorship of Augusto Pinochet.

The use of picana as a torture mechanism in Nicaragua in the 1970s by the National Guard under the Somoza dictatorship has also largely been documented.

== Other electrical prods ==
Reports can be confusing because the word picana is sometimes used to describe any prod or device used to administer electric shock during torture. Prods can be as simple as wire with the insulation removed from the end or a screwdriver with a wire attached to the metal shaft. While superficially similar to the picana, they use mains, or lower, voltage rather than the many thousands of volts of the true picana.

Other high voltage devices such as the stun gun or electroshock weapon that have a more legitimate use in law enforcement, for example for officer self-defence or for incapacitating violent suspects, are sometimes used illegitimately for torture. Although working on the high voltage and low current principle, these devices are different from the picana.

== See also ==
- Graduated Electronic Decelerator
- Tucker telephone
- Violet wand
