= E. R. Shipp =

American journalist (born 1955)

E.R. Shipp
- Born: Etheleen Renee Shipp; June 6, 1955 (age 70); Conyers, Georgia, United States
- Occupation: Writer
- Employer(s): The Root (2010-2015); Morgan State University (2012-); Hofstra University (2005-2008); The Washington Post (1998-2000); New York Daily News (1994-2006); Columbia University (1994-2005); The New York Times (1980-1993)

Etheleen Renee Shipp (born June 6, 1955) is an American journalist and columnist. As a columnist for the New York Daily News, she was awarded the 1996 Pulitzer Prize for Commentary for "her penetrating columns on race, welfare and other social issues."

She is an associate professor at Morgan State University's School of Global Journalism & Communication in Baltimore, Maryland.

== Early life and education ==
Shipp was born the oldest of six children to an extremely poor African-American family in Conyers, Georgia. The "E. R." stands for "a good southern name" that she hasn't "grown into" yet. Except for a brief stay in public housing, they lacked indoor plumbing and were forced to bring in buckets of water multiple times per day. Shipp attended the J. P. Carr School until 1968, when she transferred to Rockdale County High School, where she was one of the first black students, and graduated in 1972. It was expected that she would work in a factory upon graduation, but teachers pushed her to seek scholarships. She thought journalism "sounded a hell of a lot more interesting and easier than working in a factory" and began working as a home economics correspondent for a local newspaper while still in high school.

Shipp graduated from Georgia State University in 1976 with a BA in journalism and interned at the Atlanta Journal. She moved to New York City and graduated from Columbia University with an MS in journalism in 1979 and a JD in 1980.

== Career ==
She began working for The New York Times in 1980. She worked there as a reporter and editor until 1993. In 1990, she and five other Times reporters published the book Outrage: The Story Behind the Tawana Brawley Hoax. Ellen Goodman, in The New York Times Book Review, praised its "thoroughness" and wrote that the authors "chase down every lead, go down every blind alley, talk to every Deep Throat, profile every character in a cast as long and exotic as that of a Solzhenitsyn novel." Shipp also wrote the paper's obituary for civil rights leader Rosa Parks. It is common practice to write obituaries of famous people in advance. Shipp began the obituary in 1988 and Parks died in 2005, long after Shipp left the Times.

In 1993 she left the Times to pursue graduate work in history. She earned an MA in history in 1994 and was working on a PhD thesis about relations between former slaves and former slave owners in rural Georgia, including an examination of her own family history. She also became an assistant professor at the Columbia University Graduate School of Journalism and was faculty supervisor of the student publication Bronx Beat.

Shipp began writing for the New York Daily News as an op-ed columnist in 1994. She said "If you feel passionate about a subject, the columns almost write themselves." Among the topics she wrote about the year she won the Pulitzer were affirmative action, Johnnie Cochran and the O. J. Simpson murder trial, and the Million Man March. "There are no sacred cows in a Shipp column", wrote the Daily News in the letter nominating her for a Pulitzer. Her columns have prompted angry feedback, including from members of her own church, the Abyssinian Baptist Church in Harlem, when she criticized her pastor, Calvin O. Butts, in one column. However, when Shipp was awarded the Pulitzer, Butts led his congregation in a standing ovation from the pulpit.

From 1998 to 2000, Shipp served as the ombudsman at The Washington Post, which had one of the few and perhaps the most independent of such positions in the US news media. As the person responsible for discussing the Post's policies and editorial decisions, among the issues she discussed in her column were the murder of Jesse Dirkhising and the coverage of the candidates in the 2000 presidential election. She complained about the inaccessibility of the newsroom and its lack of communication with readers but expressed hope that these issues could be addressed.

In 2005, Shipp left Columbia and became the Lawrence Stessin Distinguished Professor of Journalism at Hofstra University in Hempstead, New York.

In 2006, The Daily News dropped Shipp's column. She said "I join the rest of my journalistic generation of pioneers who don't have the jobs they thought they had."

In 2012, Shipp was named as "Journo in Residence" at Morgan State University in Baltimore.

== Personal life ==
Shipp lived in Center Moriches, New York. As of 2013, she lives in Baltimore.
