= James Waybern Hall =

American serial killer (1921–1946)

- Born: January 28, 1921; Pulaski County, Arkansas, U.S.
- Died: January 4, 1946 (aged 24); Tucker Unit, Arkansas, U.S.
- Status: Executed by electrocution
- Conviction: First degree murder
- Penalty: Death

Details
- Victims: 4–24
- Date: 1938 (suspected) – 1945
- Country: United States
- States: Oklahoma, Arkansas, Kansas, Texas, Arizona
- Imprisoned at: Tucker Unit

James Waybern Hall (January 28, 1921 – January 4, 1946), nicknamed "Red" or "Big Jim", was an American serial killer involved in the murders of his wife and multiple other victims, although his confirmed victim count was four in most sources. Hall killed his 19-year-old wife Fayrene Clemmons near the Arkansas River on September 14, 1944, six months after he married her. Subsequently, between January and February 1945, Hall murdered another three men, whom he encountered while hitchhiking in different locations across Little Rock, Arkansas.

Apart from the four confirmed killings, Hall confessed to having committed at least 20 additional murders in Arkansas and other states between 1938 and 1945, bringing his suspected victim count to at least 24 in total. After his arrest in March 1945, Hall was charged and convicted of the murder of his wife, and thus sentenced to death and executed by the electric chair on January 4, 1946.

== Early life ==
James Waybern Hall was born on January 28, 1921, in Pulaski County, Arkansas. Hall, who had at least ten siblings, was the son of Samuel Jerome Hall, a farmer and minister known for his strict and reportedly abusive parenting. During his childhood, Hall often sought refuge in the nearby woods to escape his father's harsh treatment. At the age of 12, Hall suffered a head injury, presumably due to his father's abuse.

After completing the eighth grade, he left school in 1937 and soon began living independently. Hall would wander around the country and end up in various places like Kansas and Detroit in Michigan. In 1938, Hall met and married his first wife, with whom he had a son born on Christmas in 1941, but the child died at birth. They had a second son born in March 1943 before divorcing. After his divorce in 1943, Hall was conscripted into the U.S. Navy that same year but received a dishonorable discharge eight weeks after his enlistment due to him dodging his training. In 1944, Hall married a second time to 19-year-old Fayrene Clemmons, who was later murdered by Hall.

== Murders ==
Based on the confession of James Hall to authorities, Hall committed multiple murders between 1938 and 1945, with the suspected total number being 24 or more, although he was confirmed to have killed four, including his wife, between 1944 and 1945.

=== Suspected murders (1938–1944) ===
The first murder allegedly committed by Hall took place in 1938, when an African-American woman was beaten to death by Hall in Salina, Kansas. That same year, Hall worked at a local farm in Arizona, where he killed another ten people, all of whom were Mexican migrant workers working at the farm itself. According to Hall's confession, the immigrants were killed one by one, and each of them was either shot or bludgeoned to death.

Between 1940 and 1944, Hall was suspected of committing several additional murders across Kansas, Texas, and Oklahoma. Among the alleged victims were 21-year-old Army Corporal Charles Nipper and osteopathologist Dr. E.M. Lambert, both found shot to death on October 30, 1944, in Kansas. Other suspected victims included a traveling Bible salesman in Texas and two men in Oklahoma—one killed in 1940 and the other in 1944.

According to true crime writer Janie Jones in 2016, she found evidence proving that Nipper and Lambert were killed by Hall, given that the two men died under similar circumstances as the 1945 hitchhiker serial murders, which Hall committed in Arkansas. Nipper's 81-year-old cousin Bill Cook, who was ten at the time of the murder, told a newspaper in 2016 that the family was informed that a serial killer was responsible but lamented that his cousin's murder was never conclusively solved.

=== Murder of Fayrene Clemmons (1944) ===
On September 14, 1944, Hall killed his second wife, Fayrene Clemmons, who was 19 at the time. Clemmons was the first confirmed victim of his killing spree.

Six months before the murder, 23-year-old Hall married Clemmons on March 14, 1944. However, merely three months after the marriage, the couple briefly separated. Subsequently, on the night of September 14, 1944, Clemmons attended a dance at Rainbow Garden with her husband and another friend named Katy Bryant (also known as Mrs. Clyde Green in court sources), who was taken back home by the couple, noted to have been quarrelling in the car before leaving the friend's house. According to Bryant, that was the last time she saw Clemmons alive, and Clemmons was never seen again by anyone.

After bringing Bryant home, Hall would take his wife to a road near the Arkansas River in Little Rock, Arkansas, where he bludgeoned her 20 times or so in the head, which had led to her death. He then abandoned his 19-year-old wife's body near the river.

Two weeks after her murder, on September 28, 1944, Hall contacted his father-in-law and lied that Clemmons had been missing since September 25, 1944. In a false report to the police, Hall lied that his wife was promiscuous and had been missing for over three days. Due to a lack of evidence linking Hall to his wife's disappearance, the police closed the case soon after, and Clemmons was classified as a missing person.

=== 1945 hitchhiker murders ===
Between January and February 1945, Hall would kill another three men, all of whom were motorists or drivers he encountered while hitchhiking in different locations throughout Little Rock, Arkansas.

On January 29, 1945, an African-American barber and bootlegger named Carl Hamilton, nicknamed "the Camden Barber", was found dead with a gunshot wound to the chest; his body was discovered slumped over the steering wheel of his car. The forensic findings showed that Hamilton was killed several days before his body was found.

On February 1, 1945, E. C. Adams, a war plant worker at Little Rock, failed to show up at the workplace, believed to have disappeared on his way to work, and was subsequently found dead hours later at Dallas County (outside Fordyce), with a gunshot wound to the head that was caused by a .38 caliber pistol.

On the same date of Adams' murder, a 30-year-old truck driver named Doyle Mulherin, who worked for a meatpacking company in Little Rock, went missing after he was last seen leaving for a delivery, which he ultimately never made. His body was found a week later near the Bayou Meto Bridge outside Stuttgart. Police found through investigations that Mulherin, who had a gunshot wound to the head, was killed with the same .38 caliber pistol that caused the death of Adams.

=== Murder of J. D. Newcomb Jr. (1945) ===
On March 9, 1945, Hall was suspected to have killed J. D. Newcomb Jr., whose charred remains were found inside of a burned-out, abandoned car near Heber Springs, in Cleburne County. Reportedly, Hall was picked up by Newcomb somewhere in Pulaski County and then later shot by Hall after asking him to stop his car in Conway. Newcomb's identity was confirmed based on his dental records.

== Arrest and confession ==
On March 15, 1945, James Hall was arrested in Little Rock and brought into police custody a day later. Hall confessed to the murder of his wife and brought the police to the river where he killed Clemmons and disposed of her body. The police discovered a human jawbone, a pair of ladies' shoes, human hair, pieces of a red dress with buttons, and some other human bones; a farmer living near the area had previously found a human skull, belonging to Clemmons, prior to Hall's arrest. The farmer said that he never reported the finding to the police when questioned, believing it to be a possible foreigner that had drowned to death in the river. The family of Clemmons was able to identify her through her teeth. Katy Bryant, who was the last person to see Clemmons alive, identified the pieces of the red dress as the same clothes last worn by Clemmons before her murder.

Additionally, Hall also confessed to the other murders he had committed from 1938 to 1945. He also led the police to the location where he killed Newcomb, his purported last victim. By March 25, 1945, the police speculated that Hall killed a total of 17 people but remained skeptical of the confession he made. Hall was detained at the Tucker Unit while pending trial for the murders of his wife and five others conclusively linked to him.

== Trial and appeal ==
On May 7, 1945, less than two months after his arrest, James Hall stood trial solely for the murder of his wife, and the prosecution would seek the death penalty against Hall. Hall reportedly put up a defense that he was insane at the time of the murder, although pre-trial psychiatric evaluations deemed him sane and fit to plead and stand trial for the crime. Five psychiatrists were summoned by the defense to testify on behalf of Hall.

On May 9, 1945, after a two-day trial, Hall was found guilty of first-degree murder by a Pulaski County jury. On that same day, the jury issued their verdict on the sentence, unanimously recommending capital punishment for Hall.

On May 14, 1945, Hall was officially sentenced to death via electrocution by Judge Lawrence C. Auten based on the jury verdict. Hall's lawyers confirmed they would appeal against the death sentence. Hall was thus transferred to death row at the Tucker Unit.

On October 22, 1945, the Arkansas Supreme Court dismissed Hall's appeal against his death sentence. A bid for rehearing of the appeal was also denied on November 19, 1945.

== Execution ==
On January 4, 1946, 24-year-old James Waybern Hall was put to death by the electric chair at the Tucker Unit. Before the electric chair was activated, Hall's purported last words to prison guards were, "Boys, I'm not afraid, I can take it." About 64 people witnessed the execution, one of whom was A. Z. Clemmons, Hall's father-in-law and the father of Clemmons. According to Clemmons's father, during the final prison visit with his son-in-law, Hall stated he never meant to kill his wife and said it was an accident.

Prior to his execution, Hall made one final appeal to Arkansas Governor Benjamin T. Laney for clemency to avoid execution, but Laney declined to commute Hall's death sentence to life imprisonment and rejected the clemency petition. Hall, who was reportedly cheerful on the night before his execution, ate a last meal of steak, pork chops, and strawberry ice cream before he was executed. A source revealed that throughout his incarceration on death row, Hall spent time reading the Bible in his cell and committed himself to religion.

== Aftermath ==
In 2021, 75 years after James Hall's execution, American true crime writer Janie Jones wrote a book titled The Arkansas Hitchhike Killer: James Waybern "Red" Hall, which was based on the life of Hall and the murders he committed, including the suspected ones linked to him. Jones reportedly did research on the confirmed killings, as well as the others which Hall confessed to or he was suspected of committing, and opined that if all the 24 or so murders were proven to be true, Hall was likely the deadliest and most prolific murderer in Arkansas, surpassing Ronald Gene Simmons, who killed 16 victims (including 14 members of his family).

That same year, another book about Hall, titled The Hitchhiker from Hell: Life of Serial Killer James Waybern Hall, was also published and written by American author Jack Smith.

== See also ==
- Capital punishment in Arkansas
- List of people executed in Arkansas (pre-1972)
- List of people executed in the United States in 1946
- List of people executed by electrocution
- List of serial killers in the United States
