= Cummins Unit =

Prison in Arkansas, United States

Cummins
- Unincorporated community
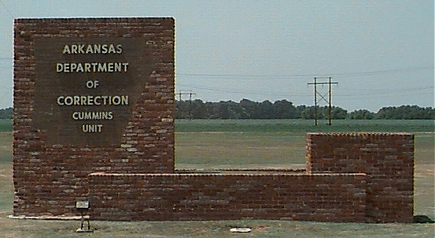
- Cummins Unit

- Location within the state of Arkansas
- Coordinates: 34°03′05″N 91°35′02″W
- Country: United States
- State: Arkansas
- County: Lincoln
- Township: Auburn Township and Choctaw Township
- Elevation: 177 ft (54 m)
- Time zone: UTC-6 (Central (CST))
  - Summer (DST): UTC-5 (CDT)
- ZIP Code: 71644
- Area code: 870
- GNIS feature ID: 64050; GNIS for prison building: 82008

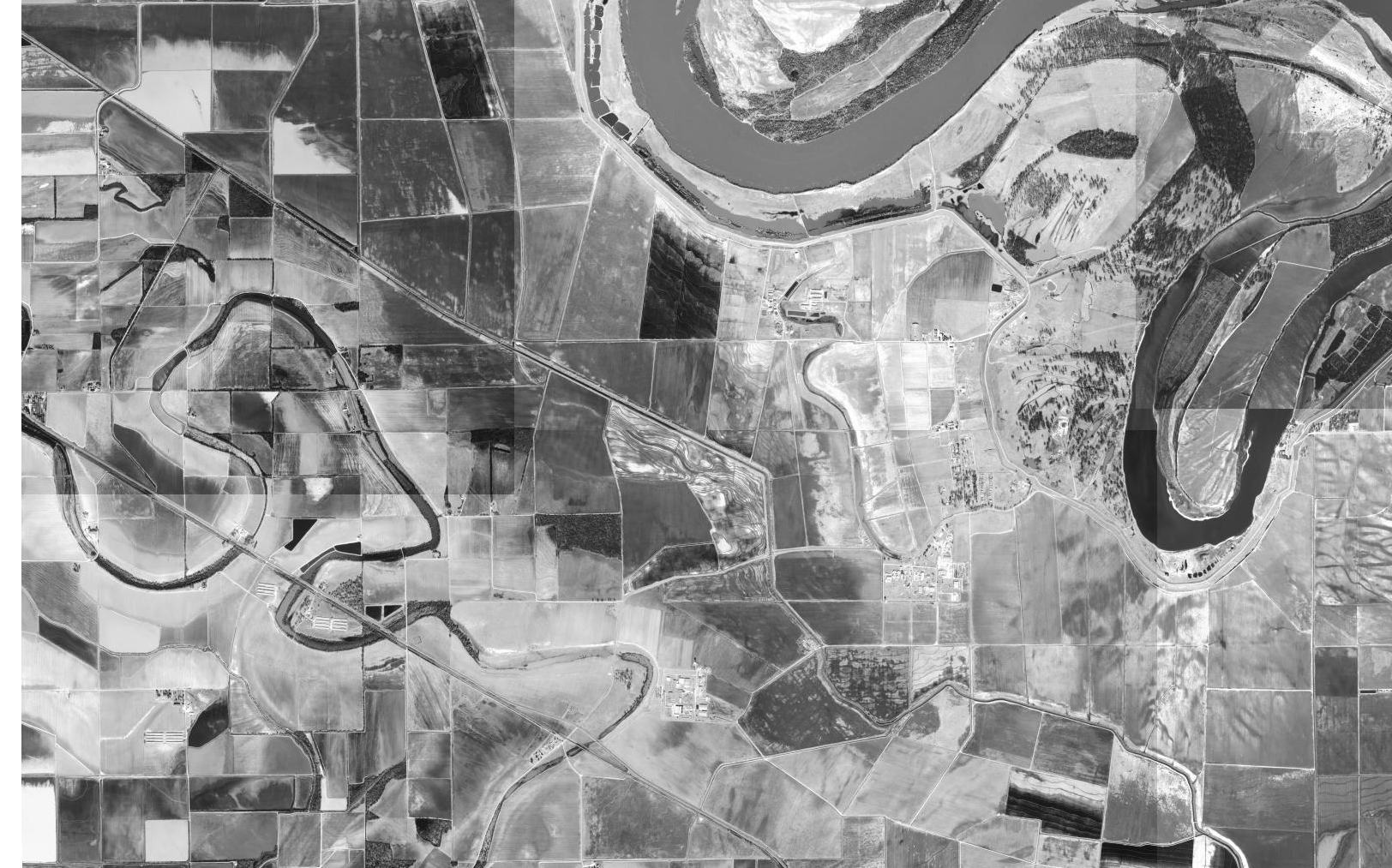
Aerial view of the Cummins and Varner units, U.S. Geological Survey, February 28, 2001

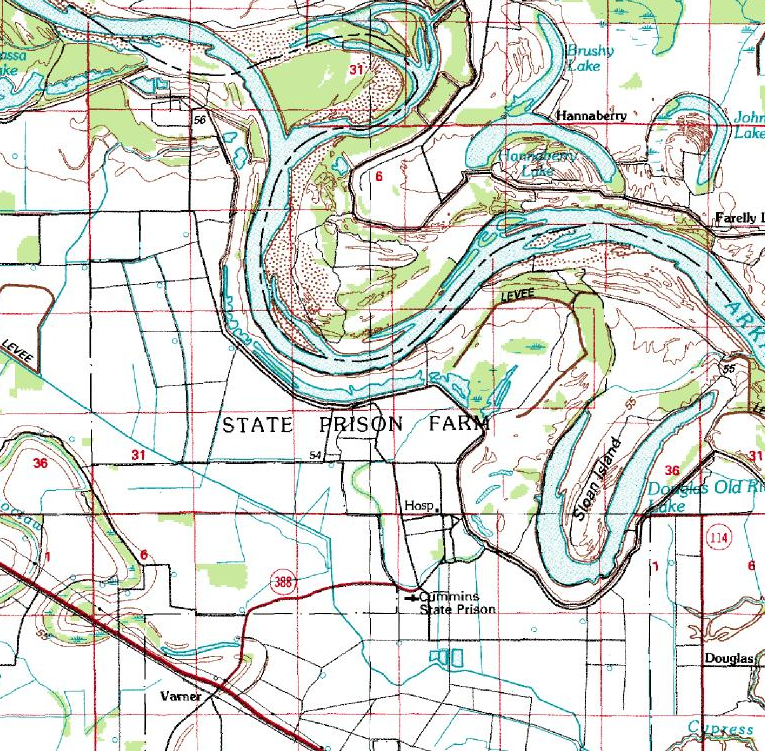
Topographic map of the Cummins Unit, U.S. Geological Survey, July 1, 1984

The Cummins Unit (formerly known as Cummins State Farm) is an Arkansas Department of Corrections prison in unincorporated Lincoln County, Arkansas, United States, in the Arkansas Delta region. It is located along U.S. Route 65, near Grady, Gould, and Varner, 28 miles (45 km) south of Pine Bluff, and 60 miles (97 km) southeast of Little Rock.

This prison farm is a 16,500-acre (6,700 ha) correctional facility. The prison first opened in 1902 and has a capacity of 1,725 inmates. Cummins housed Arkansas's male death row until 1986, when it was transferred first to the Tucker Maximum Security Unit. The State of Arkansas execution chamber is located in the Cummins Unit, adjacent to the location of the male death row, the Varner Unit. The female death row is located at the McPherson Unit. Cummins is one of the State of Arkansas's "parent units" for male prisoners; it serves as one of several units of initial assignment for processed male prisoners.

== History ==
In 1902 the State of Arkansas purchased about 10,000 acres (4,000 ha) of land for $140,000 ($5,210,000 when adjusted for inflation) to build the Cummins Unit. The prison was established during that year, and prisoners began occupying the site in December. The prison occupied the former Cummins and Maple Grove plantations. Both had been used for growing cotton.

Then-Governor of Arkansas Jeff Davis wanted the state to buy a farm in Jefferson County owned by Louis Altheimer, a Republican Party leader who was Davis's friend. When the legislature instead purchased the land for Cummins, Davis put up political opposition, trying to force the state to cancel the purchase.

In 1933 Governor Junius Marion Futrell closed the Arkansas State Penitentiary ("The Walls"), and some prisoners moved to Cummins from the former penitentiary. Since the establishment of the prison, it had housed African-American men and women. Beginning in 1936, white male prisoners with disciplinary problems were housed at Cummins. As of 1958, most prisoners worked in farming, producing cotton, livestock, and vegetables. The prison, during that year, housed clothing and lumber manufacturing facilities. In 1951 white female prisoners were moved from the Arkansas State Farm for Women to Cummins.

On September 5, 1966, riots occurred at Cummins and 144 prisoners attempted a strike. Arkansas State Police ended the strike with tear gas. In 1970 some prisoners asking for segregated housing started a riot, leading to an intervention by state police.

In 1969 Johnny Cash performed at a concert in Cummins Unit. He donated his own money so a chapel could be built there.

In 1972 Arkansas's first prison rodeo was held at the Cummins Unit. In 1974 death row inmates, previously at the Tucker Unit, were moved to the Cummins Unit. In 1976 female inmates were moved from the Cummins Unit to the Pine Bluff Unit. In 1978 a new execution chamber opened at Cummins Unit. In 1983 the Cummins Modular Unit opened. In 1986 death row inmates were moved to the Maximum Security Unit. In 1991 the vocational technology program moved from the Cummins Unit to the Varner Unit. In 2000 Arkansas's first lethal electrified fence, built with inmate labor, opened at the Cummins Unit.

A tornado affected the Cummins Unit facility in May 2011. It damaged the dairy facility, the chicken and swine houses, and the employee housing in the Free Line area. The tornado destroyed the prison's three green houses. It also turned over a center pivot irrigation system.

In 2020 the prison was affected in the COVID-19 pandemic in Arkansas. According to correctional staff, the administration initially did not wish for correctional staff to wear masks to avoid frightening prisoners. As of April 25, 2020, 33 correctional employees and 800 prisoners had COVID-19. As of 15 June 2020 11 Cummins prisoners had died from COVID-19.

=== Torture ===
In 1968, Tom Murton alleged that three human skeletons found on the farm were the remains of inmates who had been subjected to torture, prompting a publicized investigation which found "a prison hospital served as torture chamber and a doctor as chief tormentor."

The revelations included allegations of electrical devices connected to the genitalia of inmates. The Arkansas State Penitentiary System at that time had already been found to have held inmates at the Cummins Unit under conditions rising to the level of unconstitutionally cruel and unusual punishment, in cases tried by the US District Court for the Eastern District of Arkansas, among others.

Certain characteristics of the Arkansas prison system serve to distinguish it from most other penal institutions in this country. First, it has very few paid employees; armed trusties ["trusted" inmates, according to the source] guard rank and file inmates and trusties perform other tasks usually and more properly performed by civilian or "free world" personnel. Second, convicts not in isolation are confined when not working, and are required to sleep at night in open dormitory type barracks in which rows of beds are arranged side by side; there are large numbers of men in each barracks. Third, there is no meaningful program of rehabilitation whatever at Cummins; while there is a promising and helpful program at Tucker, it is still minimal.

== Composition ==
It is located partially in Auburn Township, and partially in Choctaw Township.

Cummins has about 16,500 acres (6,700 ha) of land.

Prisoners working the fields are part of the Hoe Squad, and prisoners who refuse work are taken to solitary confinement.

A white building is and has been referred to the past as the prison's "barracks". The "telephone-pole" style structure serves as a housing unit for prisoners. The building had eight units. In the past, one was reserved for white trustees, one for black trustees, and others for other prisoners. The housing units were racially segregated. There was a separate unit for female prisoners.

The prison includes the "Free Line", the prison residences for free world employees, including the warden, several prison officials, and their families; prisoners work as house servants in the Free Line. Children (dependents of correctional staff) living on the prison property are zoned to the Dumas School District. The prison property was formerly within the Gould School District. On July 1, 2004, the Gould School District was merged into the Dumas district.

In the past the main entrance to the prison was at the terminus of a road off of the main highway. The main gate consisted of a wooden structure behind a chicken wire fence, which had barbed wire on top. A trusty shooter manned the main entrance. In past eras, the prison housed a commissary and did not house educational facilities, prison factories, or medical and dental clinics.

The Cummins Unit has an electric fence.

The Cummins/Varner Volunteer Fire Department provides fire services to the Cummins Unit property. The station is inside the Cummins Unit property, along Arkansas Highway 388. In fiscal year 2010 the Arkansas Department of Correction spent $81,691 on the fire station.

== Operations ==
As of 2006, the Cummins Unit has the largest farming operation in the Arkansas Department of Correction system. At Cummins, over 16,000 acres (6,500 ha) of land is devoted to production of crops and farm goods, including cash crops, hay, livestock, and vegetables. As of 2001 prisoners harvested corn, cotton, and rice from the fields and were supervised by prison guards mounted on horses.

Cummins previously housed the Special Management Barracks, a unit for prisoners with counseling and mental health requirements. In 2008 it moved to the Randall L. Williams Correctional Facility.

Prisoners at Cummins attend the correctional school system.

== Prisoner life ==
In the past, each prisoner worked for 10 hours per day, six days per week in the fields. Prisoners were only excused if the outside temperature was below freezing. Some prisoners who were sent to the fields lacked shoes. Prisoners did not have fixed quotas. Instead they were told to do as much work as possible. Prisoners deemed to be not doing enough work were beaten.

Trustee prisoners had authority over other prisoners. At night, all except for two of the free world prison guards left, so trustees kept the order during the night. Prisoners who were not trustees were sub-ranked as "do-pops" and "rankers". In past eras, trustee prisoners were responsible for the prison's perimeter security.

During the day, the prison barracks were empty since most prisoners worked on the fields. At night, the two free world employees patrolled the central corridor but did not venture into the barrack units. The trustees, armed with knives, kept the order at night. Some inmates, referred to as "crawlers" and "creepers", stabbed sleeping prisoners. Male on male rape frequently occurred in the housing units. The prison did not ask trustees to intervene in case of rape, and guards rarely intervened.

Prisoners did not receive payment for working in the fields. In order to buy items from the commissary, some prisoners worked there. Other prisoners sold their blood; a healthy prisoner was permitted to sell his blood once weekly.

Trustees were allowed to leave and re-enter the prison without undergoing searches, so trustees smuggled in alcohol, illegal drugs, and weapons; they then sold those items within the prison. Trustees usually bought these items from one another, since they had large amounts of money. Non-trustees, including "do-pops" and "rankers", had to pay trustees in order to get food, medicine, access to medical staff, access to outsiders, and protection from arbitrary prison punishments. Therefore non-trustees did not have large reserves of money.

Education in the Cummins Unit began in 1968, when the Gould School District started a night program.

== Wardens ==
- Thomas G. Milner (1941-1949)
- Terrell Don Hutto (beginning 1967)

== Notable inmates ==
=== Death Row ===
- John Edward Swindler, sentenced to death and executed on June 18, 1990, for the murder of Patrolman Randy Basnett.
- Ricky Ray Rector, sentenced to death and executed on January 24, 1992, for the murder of Police Officer Robert Martin.
- Darryl Richley, sentenced to death and executed on August 3, 1994, for the murder of Donald Lehman.
- Hoyt Franklin Clines, sentenced to death and executed on August 3, 1994, for the murder of Donald Lehman.
- James William Holmes, sentenced to death and executed on August 3, 1994, for the murder of Donald Lehman.
- Barry Lee Fairchild, sentenced to death and executed on August 31, 1995, for the murder of Marjorie "Greta" Mason.
- Paul Ruiz and Earl Van Denton, sentenced to death and executed on January 8, 1997, for the murders of Marvin Richie and Opal Lee James.
- Marion Albert Pruett, sentenced to death and executed on April 12, 1999, for the murder of Bobbie Jean Robertson.
- Christina Marie Riggs, sentenced to death and executed on May 2, 2000, for murders of her two children.
- Clay King Smith, sentenced to death and executed on May 8, 2001, for the murders of five people.
- Charles Laverne Singleton, sentenced to death and executed on January 6, 2004, for the murder of Mary Lou York.
- Eric Nance, sentenced to death and executed on November 28, 2005, for the murder of Julie Heath.
- Ledell Lee, sentenced to death and executed on April 20, 2017, for the murder of Debra Reese. He was the first person executed in Arkansas in 12 years.
- Jack Harold Jones, serial killer, and Marcel Wayne Williams, sentenced to death and executed on April 24, 2017. It was the first double execution in the United States since 2000.
- Kenneth Williams, serial killer, sentenced to death and executed on April 27, 2017.

=== Non Death Row ===
- Kenneth Nicely - Arkansas' longest-serving prisoner. Sentenced to life imprisonment on December 22, 1958, after pleading guilty to the September 21, 1958 murder of Prescott Police Department Patrolman Edward Virden. After he absconded on a 1968 weekend furlough, he was recaptured in Kentucky on June 27, 1974, and was given a second life sentence on October 21, 1974, after pleading guilty to the September 20, 1958 murder of car salesman Tony Brown in London, Kentucky, before being extradited back to Arkansas.
- Richard Gordon - Murdered his neighbor Joseph Clifton on September 3, 2009 after a dispute. Was convicted of first-degree murder and was sentenced to life imprisonment plus fifteen years. Story was featured on Investigation Discovery's Fear Thy Neighbor.

== Bruce Jackson's prison photography ==
In the 1960s, ethnographer Bruce Jackson began taking photographs of prisoners in Texas for his research on African-American work songs in prison. Jackson had become friends with the assistant warden of Ramsey prison farm at the time, T. Don Hutto. When Hutto became Arkansas commissioner of corrections in 1971, their friendship provided Jackson with access to prisoners resulting in numerous publications. In 2010, Jackson's photo collection from the Cummins Unit was exhibited at the Albright-Knox Art Gallery in Buffalo, New York and at the Center for Documentary Studies at Duke University in Durham, North Carolina.

== See also ==
- Trusty system
- Gates v. Collier, 1974 court decision abolishing the trusty system
- List of law enforcement agencies in Arkansas
- List of United States state correction agencies
- List of U.S. state prisons
