= Arkansas Correctional School District =

School district in Arkansas

Coordinates: 34°13′08″N 92°04′59″W

Arkansas Correctional School District, also known as the Arkansas Correctional School (ACS), and previously the Arkansas Department of Correction School District (ADCSD), is the education system that serves the Arkansas Department of Corrections (ADC) prisons and the Arkansas Department of Community Corrections (DCC) facilities. The district opened in 1973 when Act 279 was passed by the Arkansas General Assembly. The agency has its headquarters within the Pine Bluff Complex in Pine Bluff.

Since the beginning of the 1997–98 school year, ADC inmates without a high school diploma who have not passed their GED high-school equivalency exam have been required to take ACS classes.
