= Grant Hardin =

American convicted murderer

- Born: c. 1969
- Citizenship: United States
- Occupation: Former law enforcement officer
- Years active: 1990-2017
- Convictions: First-degree murder; rape; escape

Details
- Imprisoned at: Varner Unit

Grant Hardin (born circa 1969) is an American former law enforcement officer and convicted murderer and rapist. He briefly served as the police chief of Gateway, Arkansas in 2016, before being convicted of the 2017 murder of James Appleton. While imprisoned, DNA evidence linked Hardin to a 1997 rape cold case, leading to additional convictions. He gained national notoriety in May 2025 following a high-profile escape from the North Central Unit in Calico Rock, Arkansas, which triggered a 13-day manhunt in the Ozarks. Hardin is the subject of the 2023 documentary Devil in the Ozarks.

== Early life and law enforcement career ==
Hardin worked for various police departments in northwest Arkansas between 1990 and 1996, including roles in Fayetteville, Huntsville, and Eureka Springs. In early 2016, he was appointed police chief of Gateway, a town of approximately 450 people. His tenure lasted four months and was marked by reports of aggressive behavior and conflicts with local residents. He resigned in 2016 after the city council gave him an ultimatum to step down or be fired.

== Murder of James Appleton ==
On February 23, 2017, Hardin fatally shot James Appleton, a 59-year-old employee of the Gateway water department. Appleton was sitting in his truck near Garfield, when he was shot in the head. Hardin, who was working as a correctional officer in Fayetteville at the time of the shooting, pled guilty in October 2017 to first-degree murder and was sentenced to 30 years in prison.

== Rape cold case ==
Following his murder conviction, Hardin's DNA was entered into the FBI's Combined DNA Index System (CODIS). The sample matched evidence from the 1997 rape of a teacher at Frank Tillery Elementary School in Rogers, Arkansas. In February 2019, Hardin pled guilty to two counts of rape and was sentenced to an additional 50 years.

== 2025 prison escape and manhunt ==
On May 25, 2025, Hardin escaped from the North Central Unit (now the Benny Magness Unit) in Calico Rock. He bypassed security by wearing a disguise constructed to resemble a law enforcement uniform. A corrections officer at the gate allowed him to walk out after failing to confirm his identity.

The escape triggered a massive manhunt involving the Arkansas State Police, the U.S. Marshals Service, and the United States Border Patrol. After 13 days on the run, Hardin was captured on June 6, 2025, in a rugged area near Moccasin Creek, approximately 1.5 miles from the prison. On February 17, 2026, Hardin pled guilty to second-degree escape and received a 13-year consecutive sentence.

== In popular culture ==
Hardin is the subject of the 2023 HBO documentary Devil in the Ozarks, which detailed his transition from a law enforcement officer to a convicted felon and the investigation into his 1997 crimes.
