= Ouachita River Unit =

Prison in Arkansas, United States

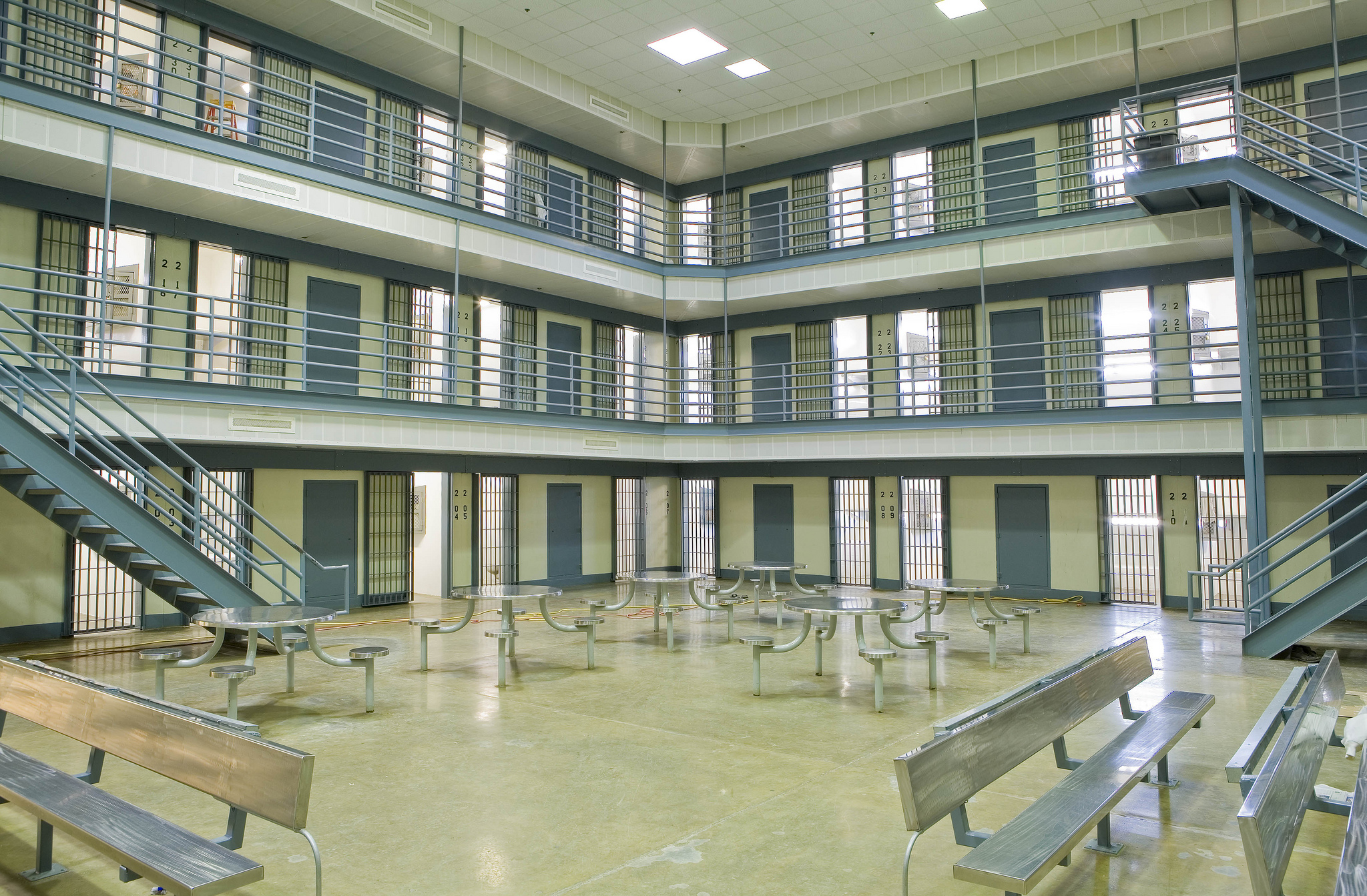
- Interactive map of Ouachita River Unit
- Location: Malvern, Arkansas; 34.344772°N 92.842777°W
- Status: Operational
- Capacity: 1782
- Opened: 2003
- Managed by: Arkansas Department of Corrections

The Ouachita River Unit is a prison in Malvern, Arkansas, operated by the Arkansas Department of Corrections. The prison opened in 2003.

== History ==
In 2012, a special needs unit was opened which included a 72-bed hospital, and a 40-bed special services area which included a barracks for elderly, chronically ill and acute-illness inmates.

Over 4000 prisoners-per-year in Arkansas are studying to receive their GED. Each May, prisoners who have earned their GED are brought to the Ouachita River Unit for a graduation ceremony.

== Operations ==
- inmate intake
- special needs unit
- regional maintenance
- garment processing
- construction
- reduction of sexual victimization program
- substance abuse education
- livestock and forage production
- education
- chaplaincy services
- gravel harvesting
- Paws in Prison program
