= Tucker Unit =

Prison in Arkansas, United States

- Interactive map of Tucker Unit
- Location: near Tucker, Arkansas; 34.454539°N 91.915571°W
- Status: open
- Capacity: 1126
- Opened: 1916
- Managed by: Arkansas Department of Correction

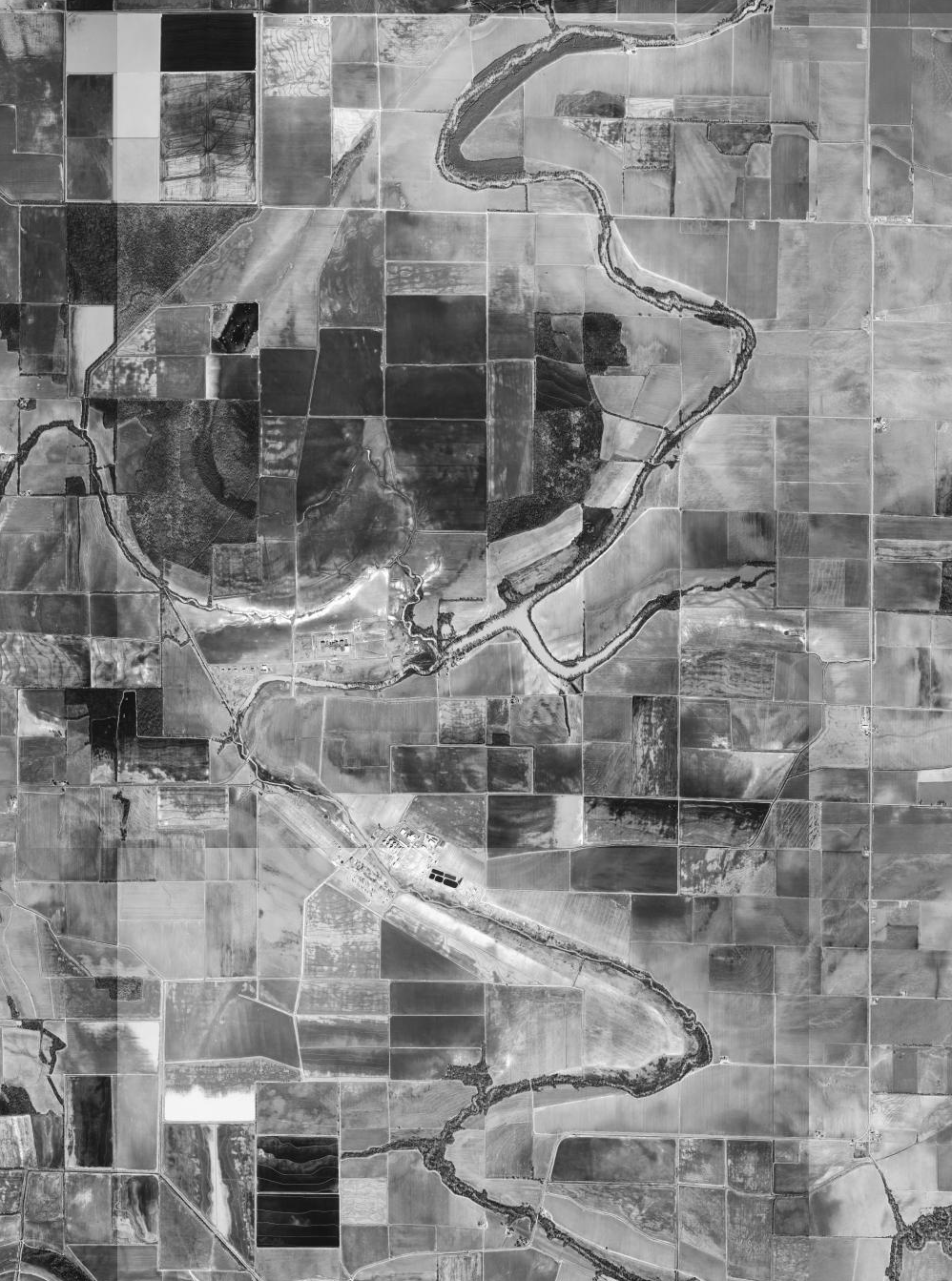
Aerial view of the Tucker Unit, U.S. Geological Survey, February 26, 1994

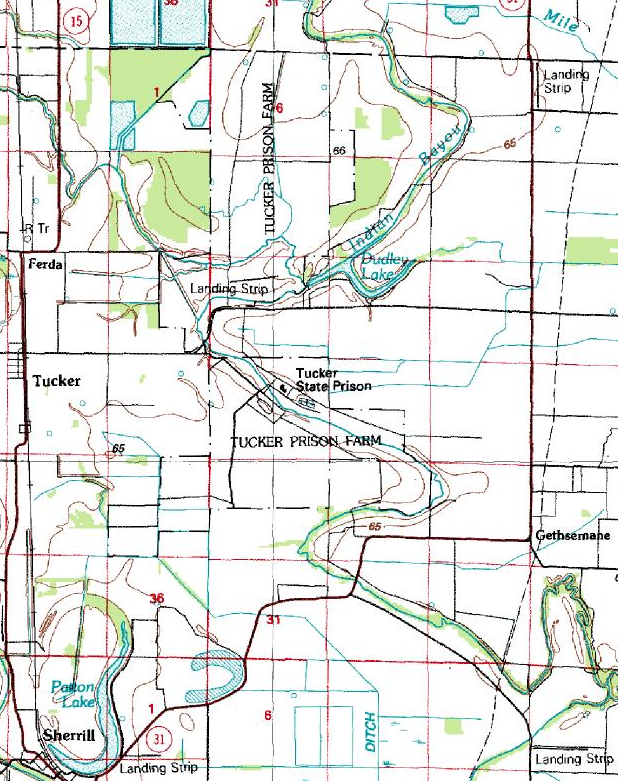
Map of the Tucker Unit, U.S. Geological Survey, July 1, 1984

The Tucker Unit is a prison in Dudley Lake Township, unincorporated Jefferson County, Arkansas, 25 miles (40 km) northeast of Pine Bluff. It is operated by the Arkansas Department of Correction (ADC). Tucker is one of the state of Arkansas's "parent units" for male prisoners; it serves as one of several units of initial assignment for processed male prisoners. It is in proximity to, but not within, the Tucker census-designated place.

A Maximum Security Unit was constructed a short distance north of the Tucker Unit in 1983.

== History ==
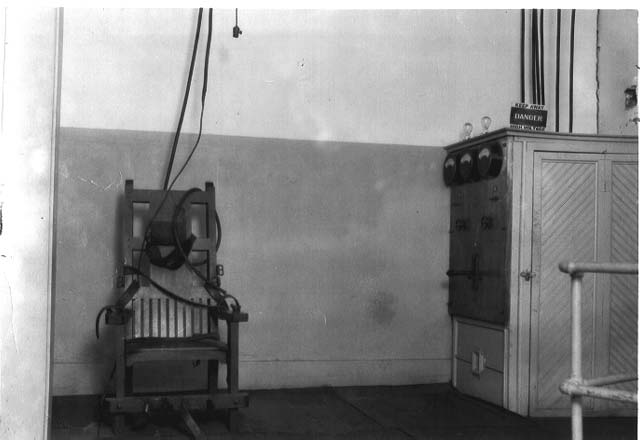
'Old Sparky' at Tucker Unit

In 1916 the State of Arkansas purchased about 4,400 acres (1,800 ha) of land to build the Tucker Unit. In 1933 Governor of Arkansas Junius Marion Futrell closed the Arkansas State Penitentiary ("The Walls"), and some prisoners moved to Tucker from the former penitentiary. In the process the designated execution chamber moved to Tucker. "Old Sparky", in operation within the state system from 1926 to 1948, was the equipment used to execute condemned prisoners at Tucker. In 1964, Charles Fields was executed at Tucker; he was the last prisoner to be executed at Tucker before the Supreme Court declared capital punishment to be unconstitutional. In history, the prison housed the state's white convicts. In addition the prison housed some black female prisoners.

In 1967 four men escaped from the unit and abandoned a vehicle used in the escape in Fort Scott, Kansas.

The Arkansas prison scandal occurred in the unit and involved the "Tucker Telephone." Due to the notoriety of the device, as of 2000, visitors to the Tucker Unit on a regular basis ask the warden if the telephone on their desk is the "Tucker Telephone."

In 1974, death row inmates, previously housed at the Tucker Unit, were moved to the Cummins Unit. In 1978 a new death chamber opened in Cummins, so Tucker was no longer the place of execution in Arkansas. In 1986 male death row inmates were moved to the Maximum Security Unit. On August 22, 2003, all 39 of the state's death row inmates, all of them male, were moved to the Supermax at the Varner Unit.

In 2000 the ADC's final 100 person barracks was split into two smaller barracks.

In 2009 prison guards left a prisoner in his own feces for a weekend. The prisoner had to be hospitalized. The Associated Press discovered that prison guards had received lap dances while working. The prison system fired several correctional employees. The same year, a Heber Springs, Arkansas man who was wanted for not reporting to his parole officer appeared at the Tucker Unit. A prison guard shot him dead. Dina Tyler, a spokesperson for the prison system, said that the man crashed his car into the car owned by the assistant warden and was "very close to the officers" prior to his death.

On August 7, 2017 a group of prisoners held guards hostage, but later released them.

== Composition and operations ==
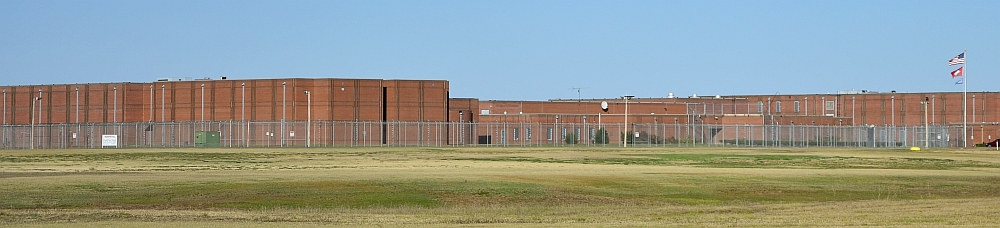
Maximum Security Unit

The Tucker Unit and the Maximum Security Unit are in Dudley Lake Township.

Of the land at the Tucker Unit, 4,500 acres (1,800 ha) are used to farm rice and soybeans.

The unit houses a campus of the Riverside Vocational Technical School. Education in the Tucker Unit began in 1968, when the England School District started a night program.

ADC officials believe that the Island of Hope Chapel was the first freestanding prison chapel in the Southern United States. It was originally dedicated in November 1969 and, after a renovation, rededicated on May 13, 2011. Its original construction was financed by a total of $80,000 donated by Johnny Cash and various other persons. The chapel has a sloping ceiling and a plexiglas fauxleaded window behind the altar, and it is made of cinder blocks. Prior to the renovation the prison had issues with rainwater leaking into the structure. The renovation, which included constructing a new roof; adding finishes to floors, pews, and walls; and installing new panes of glass, had a price of $175,000. The ADC may finance repairs and maintenance, but as per the Establishment Clause of the United States Constitution it cannot build a new religious facility.

In historical eras, white prisoners worked in the fields, and the prison housed clothing, license plate, and shoe factories.

As of 2009, 532 prisoners live in the Maximum Security Unit. That year, of the prisoners, 100 live in a barrack-style dormitory and have jobs in the prison.

== Drug-related deaths ==
Arkansas' prisons, including Tucker, have experienced a rash of inmates dying of drug overdoses while serving their prison sentence behind bars in the year 2018. This phenomenon is not just isolated in Arkansas but rather nation-wide. The drugs have been thought to be either fentanyl or synthetic marijuana. Varner Unit, Tucker's sister unit, experienced five drug-related inmate deaths in a four-day span during August 2018. Dan Shelton, who was 54 years old serving a 40-year sentence for kidnapping, burglary, and others, was the second of two inmates at Tucker who died in the same week during October 2018. The other inmate, Harrison Flanery, was 46 years old and serving a 14-year sentence which began in 2014 for sexual assault.

== Notable prisoners ==
=== Maximum Security Unit prisoners ===
Non-death row

- Davis Carpenter, perpetrator of the murder of Jesse Dirkhising
- Heath Stocks, pleaded guilty to the murder of his family in 1997

Death row and non-death row

- West Memphis 3 (all now released from prison)

Death row:

- Richard Snell - executed in 1995
- Ronald Gene Simmons - executed in 1990
- James Waybern Hall - executed in 1946
