= Grimes Unit =

Prison in Arkansas, United States

Coordinates: 35°37′33″N 91°11′18″W

- Interactive map of Grimes Unit
- Location: 300 Corrections Drive Newport, Arkansas
- Status: medium / maximum
- Capacity: 1,012
- Opened: 1998
- Managed by: Arkansas Department of Corrections

Location of Newport in Jackson County, and location of Jackson County in Arkansas

The Grimes Unit is a medium- and maximum-security state prison for men located in Newport, Jackson County, Arkansas, owned and operated by the Arkansas Department of Corrections.

The facility was opened in 1998 and has a capacity of 1,012 inmates held at medium and maximum security.

Like the adjacent McPherson Unit for female inmates, originally Grimes was managed by the Wackenhut Corrections Corp. (now GEO Group), beginning in July 1997. In 2001, after operating both at losses, Wackenhut stated that it would not renew the contract.
