= Long line rider =

Supervisor of inmates in Arkansas prisons

Long line rider was a person in the Arkansas prison system of the twentieth century who supervised inmates, particularly in the area of field production. He was second in command to the inmate yardman. Bobby Darin's song "Long Line Rider" highlighted the terror of the Cummins Prison Farm (Cummins Unit), where the skeletons of three prisoners were discovered in January 1968.

Long line riders were armed guards who rode on horseback. They were overseers of inmates who were swinging hoes. In instances when inmates escaped, long line riders released bloodhounds to track them. Long line riders at the Cummins Prison farm were made up of inmates, called trusties, who were often serving long prison sentences for armed robbery or murder.
