= East Arkansas Regional Unit =

Prison in Arkansas, United States

Coordinates: 34°50′57″N 90°35′55″W

- Interactive map of East Arkansas Regional Unit
- Location: Brickeys, Arkansas
- Status: Open
- Capacity: 1432
- Opened: 1992
- Managed by: Arkansas Department of Corrections

Location of Forrest City in Lee County, and location of Lee County in Arkansas

The East Arkansas Regional Unit is an Arkansas Department of Corrections prison in Brickeys, St. Francis Township, unincorporated Lee County, Arkansas. United States. It is about 17 miles (27 km) southeast of Forrest City. East Arkansas Regional Unit is one of the state's parent units for processed male inmates and serves for initial assignment.

== History ==
This facility was established in 1992 and has 379 employees. In 2007 after the prison system determined that some East Arkansas Correctional Officers used excessive force against prisoners, those Correctional Officers were fired.

== Description ==
The facility is ACA Accredited and has a capacity of 1,432 inmates. Operations include jail operations, education, substance abuse treatment program, canine unit, field crops, and regional maintenance.

== Notable prisoners ==
- Joshua Macave Brown, perpetrator of the murder of Jesse Dirkhising
