= McPherson Unit =

Prison in Arkansas, United States

Coordinates: 35°37′33″N 91°11′27″W

- Interactive map of McPherson Unit
- Location: Newport, Arkansas
- Status: open
- Security class: mixed
- Capacity: 971
- Opened: 1998
- Managed by: Arkansas Department of Correction

Location of Newport in Jackson County, and location of Jackson County in Arkansas

McPherson Unit is a prison for women of the Arkansas Department of Corrections, located in Newport, Arkansas, off Arkansas Highway 384, 4 miles (6.4 km) east of central Newport. Established in 1998, the prison houses the state's death row for women.

The unit houses a campus of the Riverside Vocational Technical School.

Originally it was managed by the Wackenhut Corrections Corp. (now GEO Group), with the management contract beginning in July 1997. In 2001, after operating the McPherson Unit and the nearby Grimes Unit at losses, Wackenhut stated that it would not renew the contract.

== Notable prisoners ==
Death Row

- Christina Marie Riggs – Executed May 2, 2000.
