= Brickeys, Arkansas =

Unincorporated community in Arkansas

- Unincorporated community
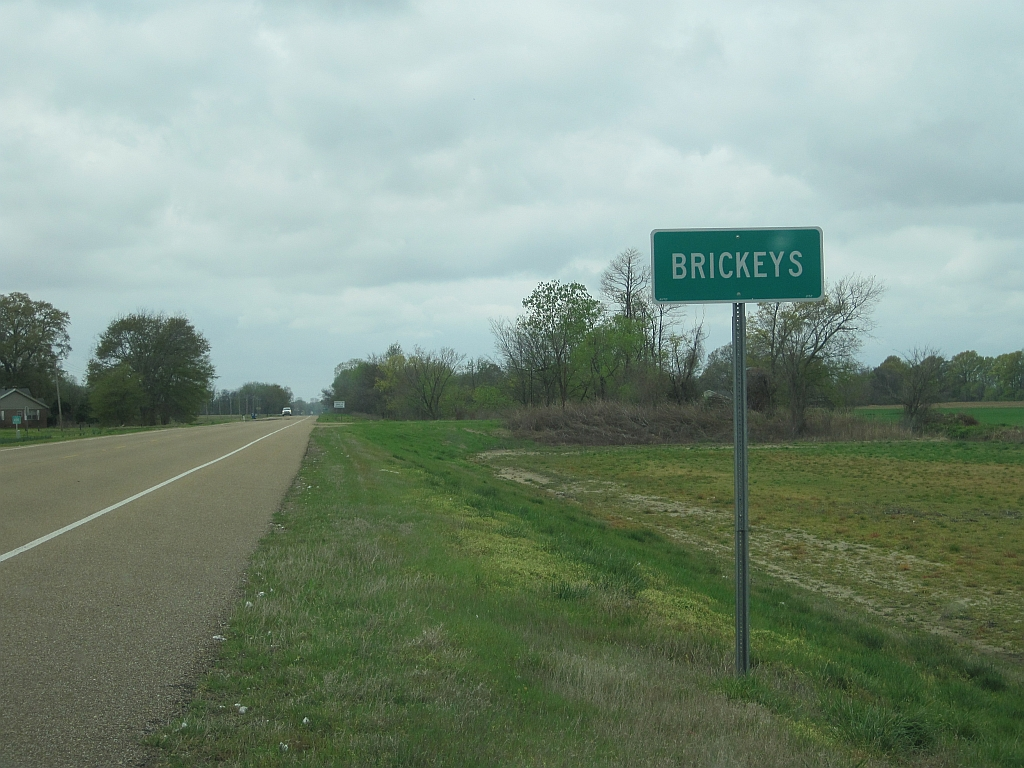

- Location within Arkansas Location within the United States
- Coordinates: 34°51′38″N 90°35′32″W
- Country: United States
- State: Arkansas
- County: Lee
- Elevation: 200 ft (61 m)
- Time zone: UTC-6 (Central (CST))
  - Summer (DST): UTC-5 (CDT)
- ZIP code: 72320
- Area code: 870
- GNIS feature ID: 57437

Brickeys is an unincorporated community in Lee County, Arkansas, United States. Brickeys is located along U.S. Route 79, 11.5 miles (18.5 km) east-northeast of Marianna. Brickeys has a post office with ZIP code 72320.

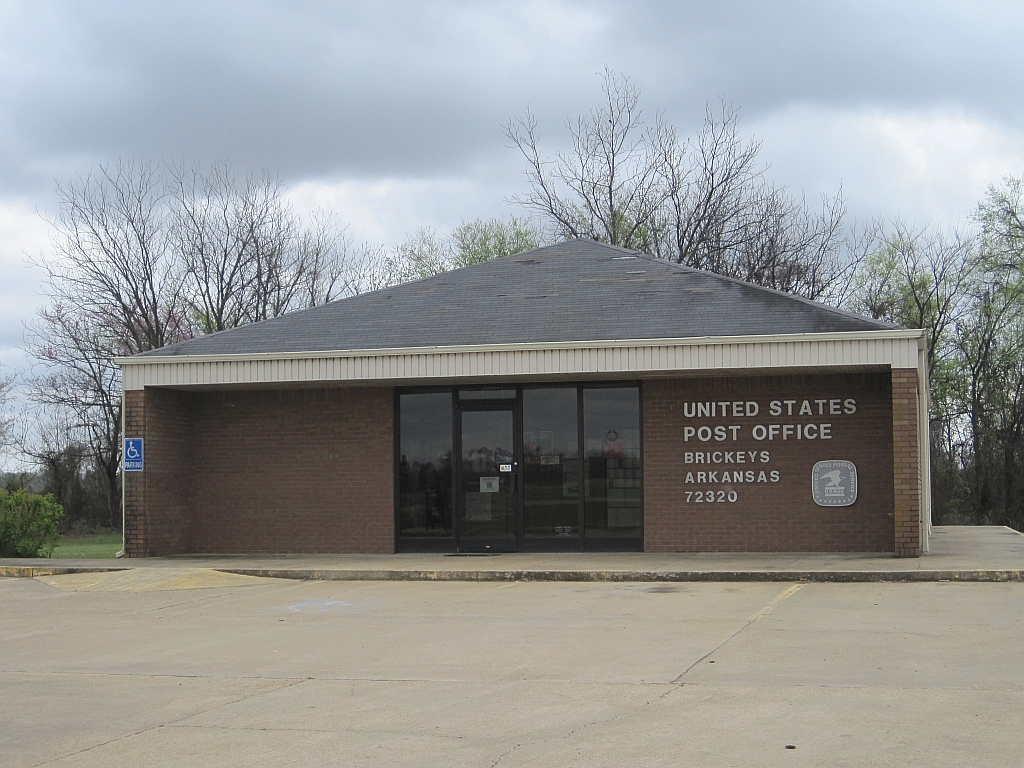
Brickeys Post Office, March 2012

== Education ==
It is in the Lee County School District, based in Marianna. The local high school is Lee High School.

In 1967 the Aubrey, Brickeys, and Moro school districts all merged into the Marianna district.
