= Tucker Telephone =

Torture device

The Tucker Telephone is a torture device designed using parts from a crank telephone. The electric generator of the telephone is wired in sequence to two dry cell batteries so that the instrument can be used to administer electric shocks to a person. The Tucker Telephone was invented by A. E. Rollins, the resident physician at the Tucker State Prison Farm, Arkansas, in the 1960s.

At the Tucker State Prison Farm, an inmate would be taken to the "hospital room", where he was most likely restrained to an examining table and two wires would be applied to the prisoner. One wire would be attached to the toe and the other to the penis, or the ground wire was wrapped around the big toe and the "hot wire" (the wire that administers the current of electricity) would be applied to the other toe. The torture device was also used on genitalia. The crank on the phone would then be turned, and an electric current would shoot into the prisoner's body. Continuing with the telephone euphemisms, 'long-distance calls' referred to several such charges, just before the point of losing consciousness. Often the victim would experience detrimental effects, mainly mental health problems. Its use was substantiated until 1968.

There are reports from American Vietnam War veterans that field phones were converted into Tucker Telephones that were used to torture Viet Cong prisoners.

A version of the device is used on a prisoner in the Robert Redford film Brubaker.

A 1974 report by Seth B. Goldsmith, SCD, noted, "The Tucker telephone not only shocked the toes of the allegedly uncooperative and incorrigible prison-farm inmates of the Arkansas penal system, but it shocked the consciousness of the nation and awakened it to the atrocious conditions inside prisons."

== See also ==
- Graduated electronic decelerator
- Picana
- Phone call to Putin
