= Simonsen =

Simonsen is a surname. Notable people with the surname include:

- Allan Simonsen (born 1952), Danish football player
- Allan Simonsen (racing driver) (1978–2013), Danish racing driver
- Bengt Simonsen (racewalker) (born 1958), Swedish racewalker
- Fanny Simonsen (c. 1835–1896), French-born soprano in Australia
- Iluska Pereira da Cunha Simonsen (1941–2017), Brazilian chess master
- Jan Simonsen (1953–2019), Norwegian politician
- John Ditlev-Simonsen (1898–1967), Norwegian sailor
- Karen Simonsen, Canadian judge
- Kirsten Simonsen (born 1946), Danish geographer and sociologist
- Lasse Simonsen (born 1953), Norwegian law professor
- Marie Simonsen (born 1962), Norwegian journalist
- Mário Henrique Simonsen (1935–1997), Brazilian economist, professor, banker, and finance minister
- Martin Simonsen (c. 1829–1899), Danish-born violinist and impresario in Australia
- Mikael Simonsen (1882–1950), Danish rower
- Olaf Ditlev-Simonsen (1897–1978), Norwegian sailor
- Per Ditlev-Simonsen (born June 12, 1932), Norwegian politician
- Peter Simonsen (born 1959), New Zealand football player
- Redmond A. Simonsen (1942–2005), American graphic artist
- Renée Simonsen (born 1965), Danish model
- Rob Simonsen (born 1978), American composer
- Rudolph Simonsen (1889–1947), Danish composer
- Steve Simonsen (born 1979), English football goalkeeper
- Thorkild Simonsen (1926–2022), Danish politician
- Wallace Cochrane Simonsen (1884–1955), Brazilian banker

== See also ==
- Simmonds
- Symonds
- Symons
- Simons
- Simonson
- Simonsson
