= Symons =

Symons is a surname which may refer to:

== Arts and entertainment ==
- A. J. A. Symons (1900–1941), English author
- Arthur Symons (1865–1945), English poet
- Elaine Symons (born 1974), Irish actress
- Emily Symons (born 1969), Australian actress
- George Gardner Symons (1861–1930), American painter
- Jane Symons (born 1959), Australian media consultant, journalist and author
- Julian Symons (1912–1994), English author
- Kevin Symons (born 1971), US actor
- Mason Symons (born 1989), American wheelchair rugby player
- Mel Symons (f. 1900–2000s), Australian media personality
- Mitchell Symons (born 1957), English author
- Peeter Symons (fl 1629–1636), Flemish painter
- Red Symons (born 1949), English-born Australian musician and entertainer
- Scott Symons (1933–2009), Canadian author

== Education ==
- Benjamin Parsons Symons (1785–1878), English academic administrator
- Joyce Symons (1919–2004), Chinese-born female educator
- Thomas Symons (1929–2021), Canadian academic and author
- Thomas B. Symons (1880–1970), American academic

== Military ==
- George Symons (VC) (1826–1871), British Army officer awarded the Victoria Cross
- Penn Symons (1843–1899), British Army officer killed in the Second Boer War
- William Symons (1889–1948), Australian officer awarded the Victoria Cross

== Politics ==
- Doug Symons (fl. 1990s), Canadian politician
- Elizabeth Symons, Baroness Symons of Vernham Dean (born 1951), English politician
- Joanne L. Symons, American politician

== Sciences ==
- Donald Symons (born 1942), American anthropologist
- George James Symons (1838–1900), English meteorological pioneer

== Sports ==
- B. J. Symons (born 1980), US athlete in football
- Bill Symons (born 1943), US-born Canadian athlete in football
- Elmer Symons (born 1977), South African motorcycle rider
- Jack Symons (1912–unknown), Australian athlete in football
- Kit Symons (born 1971), Welsh international footballer
- Michael Symons (born 1971), Australian athlete in football
- Mike Symons (1918–1984), English athlete in canoe
- Ruth Symons (1914–2004), New Zealand female athlete in cricket

== Other ==
- Ernest Symons (1913–1990), English government official
- Gordon Symons (1928–2012), Canadian writer and businessman
- Harry L. Symons (1892–1962), Canadian writer and businessman
- Joseph Keith Symons (born 1932), American Catholic bishop

== See also ==
- Mount Symons
- Simmons (surname)
- Simmons (disambiguation)
- Simons
- Symon
- Symonds
