= Simons =

Simons is a surname.

== Notable people ==
=== A ===
- Agnes Simons (died 1985), American politician
- Alan Simons (born 1968), Welsh goalkeeper
- Alexandra Simons de Ridder (born 1963), German equestrian
- Algie Martin Simons (1870–1950), American socialist journalist, newspaper editor and political activist
- Andra Simons, Bermudian writer
- Anfernee Simons, (born 1999), American professional basketball player
- Ann Simons (born 1980), Belgian judoka
- Arthur D. Simons (1918–1979), U.S. Army Special Forces officer

=== B ===
- Barbara Simons (born 1941), American computer scientist
- Benjamin Simons, British theoretical physicist
- Billy Simons (born 1983), American singer

=== C ===
- Carlos Simons (born 1954), Turks and Caicos Islands lawyer
- Charles Simons (footballer) (1906–1979), Belgian footballer
- Charles Casper Simons (1876–1964), American judge
- Charles Earl Simons, Jr. (1916–1999), American judge
- Charles-Mathias Simons (1802–1874), Luxembourg politician
- Claude Simons, Jr. (1914–1975), American college sports coach
- Claude Simons, Sr. (1887–1943), American college sports coach

=== D ===
- Dave Simons (1954–2009), American comic book artist
- David G. Simons (1922–2010), American physician and Airforce pilot
- Dot Simons (1912–1996), New Zealand sportswoman, sports journalist and writer
- Doug Simons (born 1966), American baseball pitcher

=== E ===
- Ed Simons (conductor) (1917–2018), American violinist and conductor
- Ed Simons (musician) (born 1970), English musician, one of The Chemical Brothers
- Elwyn L. Simons (1930–2016), American paleontologist
- Eric Simons (born 1962), South African cricketer
- Eva Simons (born 1984), Dutch singer-songwriter

=== F ===
- F. Estelle R. Simons (born 1945), Canadian scientist

=== G ===
- Geoff Simons (1939–2011), British freelance writer

=== H ===
- Heintje Simons (born 1955), Dutch singer and actor
- Hellmuth Simons (1893–1969), German bacteriologist
- Henry Calvert Simons (1899–1948), American economist
- Howard Simons (1929–1989), American journalist
- Hywel Simons (born 1970), Welsh actor

=== J ===
- Jack Simons (1882–1948), Australian businessman and politician
- James Harris Simons (born 1938), American mathematician and hedge fund manager
- Jan Simons (1925–2006), Canadian baritone
- Jennifer Simons (born 1953), Surinamese politician
- Jesse Simons (1917–2006), American labor arbitrator
- Jim Simons (1938–2024), American mathematician and hedge fund manager
- Jim Simons (golfer) (1950–2005), American professional golfer
- Jimmy Simons (born 1970), Dutch footballer
- Joe Simons (born 1947), Dutch ice hockey player
- Joseph H. Simons (1897–1983), American chemist
- Johan Simons (born 1946), Dutch theatre director
- John Simons, British radio executive
- John Simons (chemist) (born 1934), British physical chemist
- Jonathan Simons (born 1958), American physician and oncologist
- Josh Simons (born 1993), English politician
- Josh Simons (media executive), Australian musician and media executive
- Jozef Simons (1888–1948), Flemish writer and poet
- Jud Simons (1904–1943), Dutch gymnast

=== K ===
- Keneth Alden Simons (1913–2004), American electrical engineer
- Kip Simons, American gymnast

=== L ===
- Lao Genevra Simons (1870–1949), American mathematician and writer

=== M ===
- Margaret Simons (born 1960), Australian journalist and writer
- Marlise Simons, Dutch journalist for the New York Times
- Marylin Simons, (born 1959), Surinamese writer
- Matt Simons, American singer-songwriter and musician
- May Wood Simons (1876–1948), American writer, teacher and socialist
- Mel Simons (1900–1974), American baseball player
- Menno Simons (1496–1561), Dutch Anabaptist
- Moisés Simons (1889–1945), Cuban composer

=== N ===
- Nancy Simons (born 1938), American swimmer
- Nicholas Simons, Canadian politician
- Netty Simons (1913–1994), American pianist, music editor, music educator and composer
- Nina Simons (born 1957), American businesswoman

=== P ===
- Paul E. Simons, American diplomat
- Paullina Simons (born 1953), Russian author
- Perla Simons (born 1963), Honduran politician
- Peter Simons (academic) (born 1950), British philosopher
- Peter Simons (businessman) (born 1964), Canadian businessman

=== R ===
- Rachel Simons (1914–2004), South African communist and trade unionist
- Raf Simons (born 1968), Belgian fashion designer
- Regillio Simons (born 1973), Dutch footballer
- Renee Simons (born 1972), Canadian curler
- Richard D. Simons (1927–2022), New York State judge
- Rita Simons (born 1977), English actress, singer and model
- Robert Simons (cricketer) (1922–2011), English cricketer
- Robert Simons (economist) American economist
- Ron Simons (1960–2024), American actor and producer
- Ronald C. Simons (born 1935), American psychiatrist and anthropologist
- Ronald L. Simons (born 1946), American criminologist and sociologist
- Rosearik Rikki Simons (born 1970), American voice actor and writer

=== S ===
- Samuel Simons (1792–1847), American politician from Connecticut
- Seymour Simons (1896–1949), American pianist, composer, orchestra leader, and radio producer
- Shirley Simons (1897–1963), American architect
- Simeon Simons (1759–1853), Native American bodyguard of George Washington
- Simone Simons (born 1985), Dutch mezzo-soprano
- Sylvana Simons (born 1971), Dutch television presenter and politician

=== T ===
- Thomas Simons (born 2004), British YouTuber and Twitch streamer (known online as TommyInnit)
- Timmy Simons (born 1976), Belgian footballer

=== W ===
- Walter Simons (1861–1937), German lawyer and politician
- William Simons (1940–2019), Welsh actor

=== X ===
- Xavi Simons (born 2003), Dutch footballer

== See also ==
- La Maison Simons
- Fitzsimmons
- Simmonds
- Simmons (surname), Simmons (disambiguation)
- Simon (surname), Simon (disambiguation)
- Simonds (disambiguation)
- Simone (disambiguation)
- Symonds
- Symons
