= Simmons =

Simmons may refer to:

- Simmons (surname), including a list of people with the surname
- Simmons, Kentucky, unincorporated community, United States
- Simmons, Missouri, unincorporated community, United States
- Simmons (Red vs. Blue), a fictional character in the animated video series Red vs. Blue
- Simmons Peak
- Simmonston, abandoned town site in South Australia, Australia

== Business ==
- Simmons (electronic drum company), a manufacturer of electronic drum kits
- Simmons Bank, a bank based in Arkansas, United States
- Simmons Bedding Company, a bedding manufacturer
- Simmons & Simmons, an international law firm based in London, England, United Kingdom
- Simmons Optics, a subsidiary of Bushnell Corporation producing a line of optical products

== Education ==
- Simmons College (Massachusetts), a women's liberal arts college in Boston, Massachusetts, United States
- Simmons College of Kentucky, a historically African-American college in Louisville, Kentucky, United States

== See also ==
- Simmonds
- Simonds (disambiguation)
- Simons
- Symonds (disambiguation)
