= Ronald Simons =

Ronald Simons may refer to:

- Ronald C. Simons (born 1935), psychiatrist and anthropologist
- Ronald L. Simons (born 1946), American sociologist and criminologist
- Ron Simons (1960–2024), American actor and producer

== See also ==
- Ronald Gene Simmons (1940–1990), American mass murderer
- Ron Simmons (disambiguation)
