= Richard Symonds =

Richard Symonds may refer to:

- Richard Symonds (academic) (1918–2006), writer and United Nations development officer
- Richard Symonds (diarist) (1617–1660), English royalist and antiquary
- Richard Symonds (footballer) (born 1959), Norwich City F.C. footballer

== See also ==
- Richard Symonds-Tayler (1897–1971), Royal Navy officer
- Richard Simmons (disambiguation)
- Symonds (disambiguation)
