= Richard Simmons (disambiguation) =

Richard Simmons (1948–2024) was an American fitness personality and television personality.

Richard Simmons may also refer to:

- Richard Simmons (actor) (1913–2003), American actor
- Richard Simmons (cricketer) (1737–1802), English cricketer
- Richard Alan Simmons (1924–2004), Canadian-American screenwriter
- Rich Simmons (born 1986), British pop artist

== See also ==
- Richard Symonds (disambiguation)
- Simmons (surname)
- Richard Simmonds
