= Ron Simmons (disambiguation) =

Ron Simmons (born 1958) is an American retired professional wrestler and football player.

Ron Simmons may also refer to:

- Ron Simmons (politician) (born 1960), American former politician in Texas

== See also ==
- Ronald Gene Simmons (1940–1990), American mass murderer
- Ron Simons (1960–2024), American actor and producer
- Ronald Simons (disambiguation)
