= David A. Smyth =

British scholar (born 1954)

- Born: 5 January 1954 (age 72)
- Citizenship: United Kingdom

Academic background
- Education: School of Oriental and African Studies (BA, PhD)
- Thesis: A Study of the Major Fiction of Kulāp Sāipradit (pseud. 'Sībūraphā') (1988)
- Doctoral advisor: Manas Chitakasem (มานัส จิตตเกษม)
- Influences: E. H. S. Simmonds

Academic work
- Institutions: School of Oriental and African Studies
- Main interests: Thai language; Cambodian language; Kulap Saipradit

David A. Smyth (/smaɪð/; born 5 January 1954) is a British scholar notable for his expertise in the field of Thai studies.

== Life ==
Smyth first studied Thai at the School of Oriental and African Studies, as part of an undergraduate degree in South East Asian Studies. One of his tutors there was E. H. S. Simmonds.

He lived in Thailand from the mid 1970s until the early 1980s, teaching English first at Thammasat University and then at Srinakharinwirot University.

He received his doctorate from SOAS in 1988. His dissertation was a study of the literary works of Kulap Saipradit.

For a number of years, he was a lecturer in Thai and Cambodian at SOAS.

== Publications ==
=== Books ===
- Smyth, David A., and Manas Chitakasem (1984). Linguaphone Thai Course. London: Linguaphone Institute. ISBN 9780747310051.
- Smyth, David A. (1995). Teach Yourself Thai. London: Hodder Headline. ISBN 9780340590416.
- Smyth, David A. (1995). Colloquial Cambodian. Abingdon, Oxfordshire: Routledge. ISBN 9780415100069.
- Smyth, David A., and Tran Kien (1995). Tuttle Practical Cambodian Dictionary. Rutland, Vermont: Charles E. Tuttle Publishing. ISBN 9780804819541.
- Smyth, David A. (2002). Thai: An Essential Grammar. London: Routledge. ISBN 9780415226141. (Second edition published in 2014. ISBN 9780415510349.)
- Smyth, David A. (2019). Kulap Saipradit ('Sriburapha'): Journalist and Writer in Early 20th Century Siam. Bangkok: White Lotus Press. ISBN 9789748434711.

=== Papers ===
- Smyth, David A. (1984). "Sībūraphā and Some Ups and Downs in a Literary Career". Paper presented to the International Conference on Thai Studies, Bangkok, 22–24 August.
- Smyth, David A. (1987). "The Later Short Stories of Sībūraphā". In Jeremy H. C. S. Davidson (ed.), Laī Sū’ Thai: Essays in Honour of E. H. S. Simmonds, pp. 98–115. London: School of Oriental and African Studies.
- Smyth, David A. (2001). "Farangs and Siamese: A Brief History of Learning Thai". In M. R. Kalaya Tingsabadh and Arthur S. Abramson (eds.), Essays in Tai Linguistics, pp. 277–285. Bangkok: Chulalongkorn University Press.

=== Translations ===
- Saipradit, Kulap (1990). Behind the Painting and Other Stories. Translated by David A. Smyth. Singapore: Oxford University Press. ISBN 9780195889628.
- Surangkhanang, K. (1994). The Prostitute. Translated by David A. Smyth. Kuala Lumpur: Oxford University Press. ISBN 9789676530790.
- Saipradit, Kulap, et al. (1998). The Sergeant's Garland and Other Stories. Translated by David A. Smyth and Manas Chitakasem. Kuala Lumpur: Oxford University Press. ISBN 9789835600388.
- Korbjitti, Chart (2003). No Way Out. Translated by David A. Smyth. Nakhon Rachasima: Howling Books. ISBN 9789749138519.
- Navarat, M. R. Nimitmongkol (2009). The Dreams of an Idealist. Translated by David A. Smyth. Chiang Mai: Silkworm Books. ISBN 9789749511619.
