= Whitmore v. Arkansas =

1990 United States Supreme Court casess

- Supreme Court of the United States

Argued January 10, 1990 Decided April 24, 1990
- Full case name: Whitmore, Individually and as Next Friend of Simmons v. Arkansas et al.
- Docket no.: 88-7146
- Citations: 495 U.S. 149 (more) 110 S. Ct. 1717; 109 L. Ed. 2d 135; 1990 U.S. LEXIS 2182
- Argument: Oral argument

Holding
- The Eighth and the Fourteenth Amendments do not require mandatory appellate review of capital sentences.

Court membership
- Chief Justice William Rehnquist Associate Justices William J. Brennan Jr. · Byron White; Thurgood Marshall · Harry Blackmun; John P. Stevens · Sandra Day O'Connor; Antonin Scalia · Anthony Kennedy

Case opinions
- Majority: Rehnquist, joined by White, Blackmun, Stevens, O'Connor, Scalia, Kennedy
- Dissent: Marshall, joined by Brennan

Laws applied
- U.S. Const. amend. VIII, XIV, 28 U.S.C. § 2242

Whitmore v. Arkansas, 495 U.S. 149 (1990), is a U.S. Supreme Court Case that held that the Eighth and the Fourteenth Amendments do not require mandatory appellate review of death penalty cases and that individuals cannot file cases as a next friend unless there is a prior relationship to the appellant and unless the appellant is "unable to litigate his own cause due to mental incapacity, lack of access to court, or other similar disability".

== Background ==
Ronald Gene Simmons was convicted of the mass murder of sixteen people and sentenced to death. Arkansas state law did not require appellate review of capital sentences, and Simmons chose to contest neither the conviction nor the sentence, in fact, requesting a speedy execution:

I, Ronald Gene Simmons, Sr., want it to be known that it is my wish and my desire that absolutely no action by anybody be taken to appeal or in any way change this sentence. It is further respectfully requested that this sentence be carried out expeditiously.

Arkansas state law allowed the waiving of capital appeals so long as a separate hearing determined the competence of the condemned man. With Simmons' competence verified, his execution was to proceed when a fellow death row inmate, Jonas Whitmore, filed suit against the state of Arkansas both for himself and on behalf of Simmons.

Whitmore had been sent to Arkansas' death row in 1989 for stabbing to death 62-year-old Essie Black on August 14, 1986 in her Mount Ida, Arkansas home. Black had let him into her home and fed him milk and cookies. After her murder, Whitmore robbed her of $250. While on death row, he had exhausted his direct line of appeals within the state and was about to pursue a habeas corpus claim in federal court. Whitmore wanted to see Simmons' case appealed within Arkansas because he believed that if his plea in the federal courts was successful and he was granted a new trial in which he was convicted anew, during sentencing, his single murder would look far less bad than Simmons' massacre of sixteen. Whitmore's attempt to force Simmons's case into appeal was three-pronged, arguing that:

- He suffered injury by Simmons' lack of appeal and therefore the absence of Simmons' murder being considered during comparative review.
- Lack of appellate review violated the Constitution's protections against cruel and unusual punishment and due process.
- Whitmore also filed as next friend to Simmons, trying to force, in Simmons' name, the appeal that Simmons himself refused.

=== Petition by Louis Franz ===
Prior to Whitmore seeking appeal of Simmons' sentence, Louis J. Franz filed an appeal for Simmons as his next friend. Franz was a Catholic priest who ministered to prisoners in Arkansas and was also a member of Arkansas Churches for Life, an anti-death penalty organization. The Arkansas Supreme Court granted a stay of Simmons' execution while they considered Franz's petition. The Arkansas courts ultimately rejected Franz's petition due to the fact that Franz had not established that he had previously met Simmons, let alone had a close relationship to him. Franz also claimed standing as an aggrieved taxpayer and a concerned citizen. Both of those claims were also rejected.

=== Petition by Whitmore ===
In 1989, the Arkansas Supreme Court, citing Franz's petition, rejected Whitmore's motion to intervene in Simmons' case.

On March 15, 1989, the U.S. Supreme Court issued a stay of execution for Whitmore to give time for it to consider his case.

On March 30, 1989, the U.S. Court of Appeals for the Eighth Circuit issued a stay of execution.

== Opinion of the Court ==
The Court ruled against Whitmore on April 24, 1990, with Chief Justice Rehnquist writing for the majority of seven.

- Whitmore's "hypothetical" claim of injury was rejected as Whitmore could not prove that Simmons' appeal would change the outcome of a future sentencing review for Whitmore. Furthermore, that mandatory appellate review of Simmons' case was not a right "granted to [Whitmore] personally."
- While Simmons had the right to appellate review, it did not violate the Eighth Amendment's prohibition on "cruel and unusual punishment" for Simmons to not be forced to request appellate review, and thus Whitmore had no cause for action as an interested member of the public.
- Lastly, Whitmore was ineligible to file suit as next friend because Simmons, as an evidentiary hearing had shown, "[had] given a knowing, intelligent, and voluntary waiver of his right to proceed, and his access to court [was] otherwise unimpeded." Next friend was designed for cases where the real party in interest is "unable to litigate his own cause due to mental incapacity, lack of access to court, or other similar disability".

=== Dissent ===
Justice Marshall wrote a dissent that was joined by Justice Brennan. Justice Marshall concluded that:

- While appellate review is, as previously decided, not required in non-capital cases, "the unique, irrevocable nature of the death penalty necessitates safeguards not required for other punishments," as "[t]he core concern of all our death penalty decisions is that States take steps to ensure to the greatest extent possible that no person is wrongfully executed. A person is just as wrongfully executed when he is innocent of the crime or was improperly convicted as when he was erroneously sentenced to death. States therefore must provide review of both the convictions and sentences in death cases."
- Whitmore, as a citizen, has standing because appellate review "protect[s] society's fundamental interest in ensuring that the coercive power of the State is not employed in a manner that shocks the community's conscience or undermines the integrity of our criminal justice system."
- Simmons is unable to waive appellate review as a defendant cannot make a "voluntary submission to a barbaric punishment," just as "a defendant's consent to being drawn and quartered or burned at the stake would not license the State to exact such punishments."

== Aftermath ==
Ronald Gene Simmons was executed by lethal injection on June 25, 1990.

Jonas Whitmore was executed on May 11, 1994.

Whitmore was cited in the Fourth Circuit Court of Appeals' decision in Hamdi v. Rumsfeld to deny both Christian Peregrim, a private citizen, and Frank Dunham, a public defender for the Eastern District of Virginia, next of friend standing to request habeas relief for Yaser Hamdi, an American-born resident of Kuwait who was captured in Afghanistan.
