= Simmonds =

Simmonds as a surname may refer to:

- Ann Simmonds, English pentathlete
- Anne Simmonds, New Zealand biochemist
- Buck Simmonds, American actor
- E. H. S. Simmonds (1919–1994), British linguist
- Ellie Simmonds (born 1994), British Paralympic swimmer
- Henry Simmonds, Canada sailor at the 1932 Olympics
- Kaleb Simmonds, Canadian singer, Canadian Idol contestant
- Kennedy Simmonds, Saint Kitts and Nevis politician
- Kim Simmonds, Welsh guitarist
- Lizzie Simmonds, born Elizabeth Simmonds, English swimmer
- Megan Simmonds, Jamaican athlete
- Mark Simmonds, British politician
- Matthew Simmonds, British demoscene musician
- Millicent Simmonds, American deaf actor
- Morris Simmonds (1855–1925), Virgin Islands-born German physician
- Nicholas Simmonds (born 2006), Jamaican footballer
- Posy Simmonds, British cartoonist
- Reece Simmonds, Australian rugby league player
- Robert Simmonds, Canadian police commissioner
- Samantha Simmonds, British television presenter
- Stuart Simmonds, English Cricketer and author
- Troy Simmonds, Australian rules footballer
- Wayne Simmonds, Canadian ice hockey player
- William Simmonds (craftsman) (1876–1968), English draftsman, artist and craftsman
- William Simmonds (cricketer) (1892–1957), English cricketer
- William Simmonds Chatterley (1787–1822), English actor
- W. H. Simmonds (William Henry Simmonds, 1860–1934), newspaper editor in Tasmania

Simmonds as a fictional character may refer to:

- Jake Simmonds, in the British television series Doctor Who
- Lydia Simmonds, in the British television series EastEnders
- Norman Simmonds, in the British television series EastEnders
- Louise Raymond (née Simmonds), in the British television series EastEnders

Simmonds may also refer to:

- Simmonds Aircraft, British aircraft manufacturer
- Simmonds' disease, a lack of anterior pituitary hormones
- Pico Simmonds, a mountain in Columbia

== See also ==
- Simmons (surname)
- Simmons (disambiguation)
- Symonds
- Simonds (disambiguation)
