= Lasse Simonsen =

Norwegian law professor

Lasse Simonsen (born 1953), is a professor at the University of Oslo.

He took his cand.jur. degree at University of Oslo in 1979 and his doctorate in law in 1997. He became associate professor and later professor in 2001 and has been dean of the Department of Private Law since 2004. He has also been a magistrate and for a period of time also a judge in the Court of Appeal.

He has written several books on European law of torts and contract, most noted of which is his 1997 book on precontractual liability. He is also a co-author of The Common Core of European Private Law. Mistake, Fraud and Duties to inform in European Contract Law, Cambridge University Press 2005. (ISBN 0521844231. 414 pages)
