= Jane Symons =

Australian journalist (born 1959)

Jane Symons (born 1959) is an Australian media consultant, journalist and author based in London. She has written for a wide range of newspapers and magazines, and she is a vice chair of the Medical Journalists' Association and the public-patient information lead for the Covidence-UK longitudinal study. Her book, How to Have a Baby and Still Live in the Real World, has been published in countries including the UK, USA and Russia.

== Career ==
Symons edited the health pages of The Sun from 2004 to 2009, during which time she led a successful campaign for the breast cancer drug trastuzumab (sold as Herceptin) to be made available on Britain's National Health Service for women in early stages of the HER2 form of the disease. By highlighting delays in the implementation of Britain's national bowel cancer screening, she also forced the British government to meet its own deadlines on the tests.

Symons was praised in the British Medical Journal, where Professor David Colquhoun of the Department of Pharmacology, at University College London wrote that "It isn't often that a Murdoch tabloid produces a better account of a medical problem than anything the Department of Health's chief scientific advisor can muster."

A frequent critic of unproven therapies she has debunked homeopathy. In 2005, she was instrumental in exposing Mrs Gillian McKeith's lack of credible medical qualifications in an article headlined "Dr? No' which prompted a claim for damages which Mrs McKeith subsequently withdrew. Symons has also been mentioned in Parliament in relation to her efforts to expose serious problems within the Human Fertilisation and Embryology Authority and to raise awareness of hepatitis C.

Symons set up her own consultancy in 2009. She provides media training, advice and strategy to clients in the health, pharmaceutical and PR sector and is often invited to speak on health and the media or contribute to expert panels. She has also worked with a number of charities and edited the MS Lottery of Care report to mark the 60th anniversary of the Multiple Sclerosis Society.

Symons is also a co-investigator of the Covidence-UK longitudinal study investigating the lifestyle factors which might influence the risk of contracting Covid-19, disease severity and vaccine efficacy.

She continues to write on health issues and has contributed to many of Britain's national newspapers, including The Times, Daily Mail, the Daily Mirror, the Daily Express and Sunday Express. Previous roles include health editor of Woman's Own magazine and chief sub-editor of The Daily Telegraph Saturday magazine.

She is vice chair and website editor of the Medical Journalists' Association and a member of the Guild of Health Writers.

== Awards ==
Symons received Cancer Research UK's "National Communicator" Flame of Hope Award in 2007.

She was short-listed for Health Editor of the Year in the Medical Journalists' Association's Awards in 2009.

== Books ==
- How to Have a Baby and Still Live in the Real World (2003, US edition; 2004, UK and Swedish editions, 2009 Russian edition). (ISBN 0762414472)
- Pregnancy: The Best for You and Your Baby (Netherlands 2002, also published in France and the Czech Republic)
- Reader's Digest A to Z of Family Health (Contributor)

Symons' work has been translated into Czech, Danish, Dutch, Finnish, French, Spanish, Swedish and Russian.

== Family ==
Symons is the younger sister of Australian TV personality and musician Red Symons.
