= Alan Symonds =

Alan Symonds (September 21, 1946 – June 20, 2006) was the Technical Director of the Harvard College Theaters for many years. He entered Harvard College in the 1960s, started participating in technical theater during his freshman orientation period, and soon found himself spending much more time on technical theater than on his studies. He participated in work on the student level, but also started working with professional companies, particularly the Boston Ballet, for whom he designed low cost portable smoke generators, and the American Repertory Theater.

== Career ==
In the course of his career, Symonds was a part of the lighting crew at Woodstock. He often told the students he worked with about pouring ice cubes into the spotlights there just to keep them from overheating. He is also responsible for the New England Aquarium's penguin exhibit lighting design, and was a primary consultant in the redesign of the dilapidated theatre which originally housed the Hasty Pudding Theatricals at Harvard University.

Symonds focused on lighting and set design, education, and safety. He became well known as an architectural lighting consultant, bringing the McCandless method to lighting spaces not meant for theater. He was a volunteer fireman, and brought that knowledge back into theater production safety. (His "fire speech," incorporating exposition of the mathematical relationship between rate of combustion and available oxygen, together with the infamous threat of a lifetime ban should "so much as a piccolo" be carried during an evacuation, earned him particular notoriety.) Symonds also worked as a freelance theatre consultant for several theatre construction and renovation projects, including the new theatre and scene shop facilities at King Philip Regional High School in Wrentham, MA.

His personal approach to work and his broad areas of competence earned him a cult following of theater lovers, many of whom moved on to become successful professionals in the fields of theater and film, with great debt to his influence. He was ubiquitous at Harvard, having his hands not only in the productions of the Harvard Radcliffe Dramatic Club, but also designing lights for the Hasty Pudding Theatricals, being an integral part of the Harvard-Radcliffe Gilbert & Sullivan Players, and giving technical advice to productions staged by the Harvard Law School. In 1995, he founded the Freshman Arts Program, to ensure that students who wanted to practice the arts at Harvard would have knowledge of the resources at their disposal. He taught introductory and advanced technical theater to Harvard undergraduates. In 1998, a new position was created for him at Harvard, Technical Director for Harvard College Theatre Programs under the Office for the Arts at Harvard, to acknowledge his absolute essentiality in the Harvard theater environment.

Symonds died on June 20, 2006, at age 59, as the result of heart failure.
