= Nimitmongkol Navarat =

Thai writer (1908–1948)

M. R. Nimitmongkol Navarat
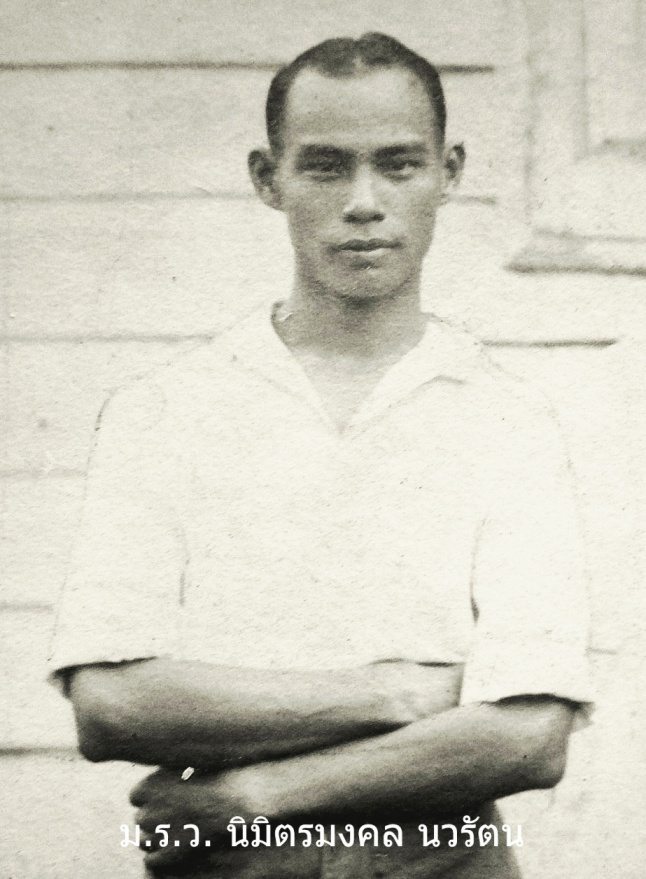
- Born: 21 April 1908
- Died: 11 April 1948 (aged 39)
- Occupation: Writer
- Writing career
- Notable work: The Dreams of an Idealist

Mom Rajawongse Nimitmongkol Navarat (Note: Mom Rajawongse is a Thai title denoting a royal bloodline.) (Thai: หม่อมราชวงศ์นิมิตรมงคล นวรัตน; RTGS: Mom Ratchawong Nimitmongkhon Nawarat; 21 April 1908 – 11 April 1948) was a Thai writer. He is best known for The Dreams of an Idealist (ความฝันของนักอุดมคติ).
