= E. H. S. Simmonds =

British linguist (1919–1994)

- Born: 1919
- Died: 1994 (aged 74–75)

Academic work
- Discipline: Linguist
- Sub-discipline: Tai languages
- Institutions: SOAS University of London
- Notable students: David A. Smyth

Edward Harold Stuart Simmonds (1919–1994) was a British linguist and professor of the languages and literatures of South East Asia at SOAS University of London.

Born in England, Stuart Simmonds was an academic based at SOAS between 1948 and 1982, who specialized in the language and history of the Thai people. He was Director of the Royal Asiatic Society from 1965 to 1968 and its president from 1973 to 1976.

Serving in the British armed forces during World War II, Simmonds was captured along with the rest of the British forces at the surrender of Singapore in 1942. He was subsequently interned in labour camps on the Burma Railway, in western Thailand, during the rest of the war. Despite the conditions, it was this experience which first sparked an interest in Thai culture, which he pursued after returning to England in the post-war period.

Simmonds played a central role in establishing the study of Tai languages, literature and culture at the university level in post-war Britain. This role was publicly acknowledged when, in 1988, the King of Thailand appointed him Commander of the Most Exalted Order of the White Elephant.

== Publications ==
- Lāi Sūʼ Thai: essays in honour of E.H.S. Simmonds. London: School of Oriental and African Studies, 1987.
- (With Simon Digby, ed.) The Royal Asiatic Society: its history and treasures. London: Royal Asiatic Society, 1979.
- Tai literatures: a bibliography of works in foreign languages. London: Bulletin of the Association of British Orientalists, 1965.
- With H.L. Shorto and J.M. Jacob). Bibliographies of Mon-Khmer and Tai linguistics. London: Oxford University Press 1963.
- The Thalang letters, 1773-94: political aspects and the trade in arms. Bulletin of the School of Oriental and African Studies; 26:3 (1963), pp. 592–619.
