= Simonsson =

Simonsson may refer to:

- Agne Simonsson (1935–2020), former Swedish footballer
- Hans Simonsson (1880–1965), Swedish Navy vice admiral
- Hans Simonsson (born 1962), retired professional tennis player from Sweden
- Philip Simonsson (1185–1217), Norwegian aristocrat, pretender to the throne of the Bagler party
- Stefan Simonsson (born 1960), former professional tennis player from Sweden
