= Simmons (surname) =

Simmons is an English patronymic surname. Notable people with the surname include:

== Artists ==
- Edward Simmons (painter) (1852–1931), American Impressionist painter
- Don Simmons (artist) (born 1973), Canadian experimental artist and writer
- Philip Simmons (1912–2009), American artisan and blacksmith

== Athletes ==
- Al Simmons (1902–1956), American baseball player
- Andrelton Simmons (born 1989), Curaçaoan baseball player
- Andrew Simmons (born 1984), British wrestler
- Anthony Simmons (American football) (born 1976), American football player
- Austin Simmons (born 2005), American football and baseball player
- Ben Simmons (born 1996), Australian basketballer
- Bob Simmons (American football coach) (born 1948), American football coach
- Bobby Simmons (born 1980), American basketball player
- Brian Simmons (born 1975), American football player
- Brian Simmons (baseball) (born 1973), American baseball player
- Cedric Simmons (born 1976), American basketball player
- Charles Simmons (gymnast) (1885–1945), British gymnast (competed in the 1912 Summer Olympics)
- Chippy Simmons (1878–1937), English footballer
- Colin Simmons (born 2006), American football player
- Coralie Simmons (born 1977), American water polo player
- Craig Simmons (born 1982), Australian cricketer
- Curt Simmons (1929–2022), American baseball player
- David Simmons (rugby league) (born 1984), Australian rugby league player
- Don Simmons (ice hockey) (1931–2010), Canadian ice hockey player
- Elijah Simmons (born 2001), American football player
- Elliot Simmons (born 1998), English footballer
- Grant Simmons (basketball) (born 1943), American basketball player
- Grant Simmons (footballer) (born 1952), Australian rules footballer
- Hi Simmons (1905–1995), American college baseball coach
- Isaiah Simmons (born 1998), American football player
- James Simmons (footballer), English footballer
- Jason Simmons (born 1976), American football player
- Jeffery Simmons (born 1997), American football player
- Jim Simmons (American football) (1903–1977), American football player
- Joe Simmons (1895–1973), American college sports coach
- Jordan Simmons (born 1994), American football player
- Josh Simmons (born 2002), American football player
- Justus Ross-Simmons, American football player
- Kobi Simmons (born 1997), American basketball player
- Lachavious Simmons (born 1996), American football player
- Lendl Simmons (born 1985), Trinidadian cricketer
- Lionel Simmons (born 1968), American basketball player
- Lloyd Simmons, American baseball coach
- London Simmons (born 2006), American football player
- Louie Simmons (1947–2022), American powerlifter
- Mark Simmons (American football) (born 1984), American football player
- Mark Simmons (boxer) (born 1974), Canadian heavyweight boxer
- Mark Simmons (cricketer) (born 1955), English cricketer
- Paris Simmons (born 1990), English footballer
- Phil Simmons (born 1963), Trinidadian cricketer
- Quinn Simmons (born 2001), American road cyclist
- Richard Simmons (1948–2024), American fitness trainer and actor
- Robert Wilson Simmons (1919–1954), American surfer
- Ron Simmons (born 1958), American professional wrestler and football player
- Roy Simmons (1956–2014), American football player
- Royce Simmons (born 1959), Australian rugby league footballer and coach
- Stephen Simmons (footballer) (born 1982), Scottish footballer
- Ted Simmons (born 1949), American baseball player
- Tony Simmons (athlete) (born 1948), British athlete
- Tony Simmons (wide receiver) (born 1974), American football player

== Businesspeople ==
- Harold Simmons (1931–2013), American business magnate
- John Simmons (clothing manufacturer) (1796–1870), clothing manufacturer
- Matthew Simmons (1943–2010), American investment banker, author
- Russell Simmons, (born 1957) American business magnate
- Sydney Simmons (1840–1924), British entrepreneur and philanthropist
- Zalmon G. Simmons (1828–1910), American business magnate, founder of Simmons Bedding Company, and politician

== Criminals ==
- Gemase Lee Simmons, (born 1976) American convicted and sentenced con man and sex offender
- Ronald Gene Simmons (1940–1990), American spree killer and family annihilator

== Educators ==
- Beth A. Simmons (born 1958), American academic and notable international relations scholar
- Donald C. Simmons, Jr. (born 1964), American educator, author, historian and public servant
- George F. Simmons (1925–2019), American mathematician
- Ruth Simmons (born 1945), 18th president of Brown University
- William J. Simmons (teacher) (1849–1890), African-American academic; eponymous second president of Simmons College of Kentucky

== Entertainers ==
=== In acting ===
- Ashley Simmons (born 1986), American wrestler (best known as Madison Rayne)
- Chelan Simmons (born 1982), Canadian actress
- Henry Simmons (born 1970), African-American actor
- J. K. Simmons (born 1955), American actor
- Jaason Simmons (born 1970), Australian actor
- Jason and Kristopher Simmons, American identical twins
- Jean Simmons (1929–2010), British-American actress
- Johnny Simmons (born 1986), American actor
- Lili Simmons (born 1993), American actress
- Richard Simmons (actor) (1913–2003), American actor
- Shadia Simmons (born 1986), Canadian actress

=== In music ===
- Alice Carter Simmons (1883–1943), American pianist, organist, and music educator
- Daryon Simmons (born 1995), American hip-hop dancer, rapper, and choreographer (best known as DLow)
- Diggy Simmons (born 1995), American rapper and son of Joseph Simmons
- Earl Simmons (1970–2021), birth name of DMX, American rapper and actor
- Gene Simmons (born 1949), professional name of American rock musician Gene Klein
- Jeff Simmons (musician) (born 1949), American rock musician
- Joseph Simmons (born 1964), American hip-hop musician
- Joseph Simmons (guitarist), American guitarist
- Jumpin' Gene Simmons (1933–2006), American rockabilly musician
- Little Mack Simmons (1933–2000), American blues harmonica player, singer, and songwriter
- Nicholas Alexander Simmons (born 1999), American rapper known professionally as YBN Nahmir
- Norman Simmons (musician) (1929–2021), American jazz musician
- Paul Simmons, American rock drummer
- Sonny Simmons (1933–2021), American jazz musician

=== In film and television ===
- Anthony Simmons (writer) (1922–2016), British writer and director
- Barry Simmons (born 1948), British quiz show participant
- Bob Simmons (stunt man) (1923–1987), British stunt man
- Julian Simmons (born 1952), Northern Ireland television presenter
- Milton T. Simmons (1948–2024), fitness personality and actor, best known as Richard Simmons
- Sue Simmons (born 1943), American news anchor

== Fashion ==
- Dexter Simmons (born 1983), American fashion designer
- Kayla Simmons (born 1995), American model
- Kimora Lee Simmons (born 1975, as Kimora Lee Perkins), American fashion model and designer
- Vanessa Simmons (born 1983), American fashion model and actress (daughter of Joseph Simmons)

== Historical figures ==
- Michael Simmons, 19th century American pioneer

== Politicians ==
- Barbara Lett-Simmons (1927–2012), American politician
- Charles Simmons (politician) (1893–1975), British Lord of the Treasury and later Parliamentary Secretary to the Minister for Pensions
- David Simmons (Australian politician), Australian politician
- Furnifold McLendel Simmons (1854–1940), American politician
- James Aubrey Simmons (1897–1979), Canadian politician and notary
- James F. Simmons, United States politician from Rhode Island
- James S. Simmons (New York politician), United States politician from New York
- Kevin Simmons, Bahamian politician
- Lindsay Simmons (born 1954), Australian politician
- Lydia Simmons, British politician
- Rob Simmons (born 1943), American politician
- Robert G. Simmons (1891–1969), American politician
- Ron Simmons (Texas politician) (born 1960), American politician
- Rouse Simmons (Wisconsin politician), (1832–1897), American politician and businessman
- William Simmons (politician) (1865–1908), Canadian politician
- W. T. Simmons, American politician from Texas

== Scientists ==
- Edward E. Simmons (1911–2004), American electrical engineer and inventor of the bonded wire resistance strain gauge
- George H. Simmons (1852–1937), editor-in-chief of the Journal of the American Medical Association and general secretary of the American Medical Association
- Gustavus Simmons (born 1930), American cryptographer
- Howard Ensign Simmons, Jr. (1929–1997) American chemist who discovered the Simmons–Smith reaction
- Michelle Simmons (1967), Australian physicist
- Norman Simmons (1915–2004), Nobel Prize winner and pioneer in DNA research
- Nancy Simmons, American Zoologist specialising in the study of bats

== Soldiers ==
- Robert John Simmons (circa 1837–1863) a Bermudian soldier who served in the British Army and 54th Massachusetts Infantry Regiment, mortally wounded at the Second Battle of Fort Wagner.

== Writers and journalists ==
- Adelma Simmons (1903–1997), American author and herbalist
- Allan Simmons (born 1957), British Scrabble player and author
- Bill Simmons (born 1969), American sportswriter and author
- Charles Simmons (author, born 1924) (1924–2017), American editor and novelist
- Christopher Simmons, American designer, author
- Dan Simmons (1948–2026), American science fiction and horror writer
- Diane Simmons, American writer
- James Simmons (poet) (1933–2001), Irish poet, literary critic and songwriter
- Matty Simmons, American newspaper reporter
- Michael L. Simmons (1896–1980), American screenwriter
- Rachel Simmons (born 1974), American author
- Steve Simmons, Canadian sports journalist
- William Mark Simmons (born 1953), American author

== Other ==
- Edwin H. Simmons, United States Marine Corps Brigadier General and Marine Corps historian
- E. H. Simmons (c. 1815 – c. 1852), American slave trader
- James B. Simmons (clergyman), recording secretary for American Baptist Home Mission Society
- Lintorn Simmons (1821–1903)
- Marion Simmons (1949–2008), British judge
- Shraga Simmons, American rabbi
- William Joseph Simmons (1880–1945), founder of second Ku Klux Klan in the United States

== Fictional characters ==
- Simmons (Red vs. Blue), a character in the machinima production Red vs. Blue
- Chanel Simmons, a character in The Cheetah Girls
- Derek C. Simmons, a character in Resident Evil
- Diane Simmons, a character in Family Guy
- Frank Simmons (Stargate), a character in Stargate
- Jemma Simmons from Agents of S.H.I.E.L.D.
- Mabel "Madea" Simmons, a character portrayed by Tyler Perry
- Matt Simmons, a protagonist of Criminal Minds and Beyond Borders
- Mindy Simmons, a character played by Michelle Pfeiffer in an episode of The Simpsons
- Mr. Robert Simmons, fictional character from the Nickelodeon animated series Hey Arnold!
- Thag Simmons, a caveman from Gary Larson's comic The Far Side
- Tuesday Simmons, one of the two main protagonists of the Netflix original anime series Carole & Tuesday
- Walter Simmons, a character on CSI: Miami
- Albert Francis "Al" Simmons a.k.a. Spawn, a superhero from Image Comics

== See also ==
- Simmonds
- Simonds (disambiguation)
- Simons
- Symonds (disambiguation)
