= Billy Simons =

American singer-songwriter

Billy Simons Jr.
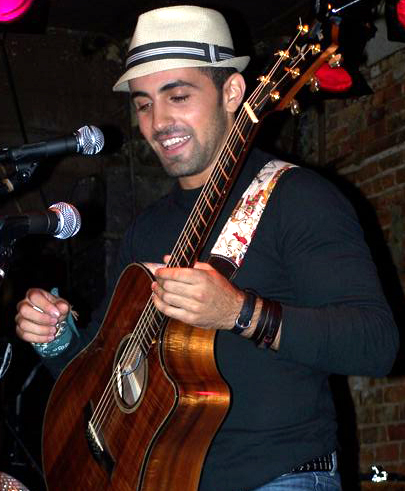
- Billy Simons performing live in New York; July 17, 2008

Background information
- Born: William Nicholas Simons, Jr.
- Origin: Ludlow, Massachusetts, United States
- Genres: Acoustic-pop; acoustic rock; folk
- Instruments: Guitar, vocals, banjo, bass, piano, ukulele, clarinet,
- Years active: 2003–present
- Website: http://www.billy-simons.com

Billy Simons Jr. is an American singer-songwriter. His music is often described as singer-songwriter and folk.

== History ==
In 2004, Billy Simons began giving live performances at New York City venues such as The Bowery Ballroom, The Bitter End, Sin-e, The Living Room, and The Canal Room. In 2007, Simons released a compilation of his compositions under the title "The Joker's Hand" (2007) on iTunes. Notable songs include "Sister Agnes," "Body," and "Part II." In 2009, Simons released a live solo acoustic album, Live at the Academy (2009). Later that year, Simons released Music From the Motion Picture (2009) following his sold-out CD release performance at The Bitter End in New York City. He has opened performances for Bobby McFerrin; Susan Tedeschi; Dave Matthews collaborator Tim Reynolds; Pete Francis of Dispatch; country musician Phil Vassar; Matisyahu; Spin Doctors lead singer Chris Barron; and Pure Prairie League.

== Discography ==
=== Studio albums and EPs ===
- 2003: Billy Simons (EP)
- 2007: The Joker's Hand
- 2008: Sessions On A Hill (EP)
- 2009: Music From The Motion Picture
- 2010: Elyria
- 2018: Bless Your Heart
- 2025: Now That We've Solved Everything
- 2025: Rotten Tomatoes
- 2025: The Gospel of Weapons

=== Live albums ===
- 2009: Live At The Academy
