= Simonson =

Simonson is a surname. Notable people with the surname include:

- Albert Simonson (1914–1965), American chess master
- Alexandre Simonson (born 1872), Belgian Olympic fencer
- Archie Simonson (1924–2018), American judge
- Bruce Simonson, American geologist
- Dave Simonson (born 1952), former professional American football player
- Des Simonson, former New Zealand rower
- Eric Simonson (born 1960), American writer and director in theatre, film and opera
- Itamar Simonson, professor of consumer psychology, decision making, market research, and marketing management
- Joy Simonson (1919–2007), women's rights and progressive activist
- Lee Simonson (1888–1967), American architect painter, stage setting designer
- Louise Simonson (born 1946), American comic book writer and editor
- Martin Simonson, Swedish scholar, novelist, and translator, specialized in fantastic literature and nature writing
- Michael R. Simonson American professor of Instructional Technology & Distance Education
- Stewart Simonson, the first Assistant Secretary for Public Health Emergency Preparedness at the US Department of Health and Human Services
- Susan Raab Simonson (1969–2006), American stage actress and theatre producer
- Walt Simonson (born 1946), American comic book writer and artist

== See also ==
- Simonson, Virginia, unincorporated community in Richmond County, in the U.S. state of Virginia
- Simonson Brook (New Jersey), also known as Sunonson Brook, is a tributary of the Millstone River
