= Joanne L. Symons =

American politician

Member of the New Hampshire House of Representatives from the Grafton 14th district
- In office 1974–1976

Personal details
- Born: February 25, 1941 Brooklyn, New York, U.S.
- Died: March 19, 2003 (aged 62)
- Party: Democratic
- Spouse: Alan

Joanne L. Symons (February 25, 1941 – March 19, 2003) was an American politician. She served as a Democratic member for the Grafton 14th district of the New Hampshire House of Representatives.

== Life and career ==
Symons was born in Brooklyn, New York. She was a school teacher.

Symons served in the New Hampshire House of Representatives from 1974 to 1976.

Symons died on December 19, 2003, at the age of 62.
