= Ronald L. Simons =

American sociologist

- Born: December 18, 1946 (age 79)
- Died: March 31, 2025 (aged 78)
- Education: BA, Sociology/Psychology, University of Northern Iowa; M.S.S.W. Social Work (minor in Psychology), University of Wisconsin; PhD, Sociology, Florida State University
- Known for: Work on the role of family and racial socialization in juvenile delinquency
- Awards: 2013 Best Article Award from the American Society of Criminology; Fellow of the American Society of Criminology since 2015
- Scientific career
- Fields: Criminology; Sociology
- Institutions: University of Georgia; Arizona State University; Iowa State University
- Thesis: Social structure, tacit knowledge and deviant behavior: a phenomenological perspective on social interaction (1974)

Ronald L. Simons (born December 18, 1946) was an American sociologist, criminologist, and Distinguished Research Professor of Sociology at the University of Georgia.

== Early life and education ==
Simons was born on December 18, 1946. He earned his Bachelor of Arts degree in Sociology and Psychology from the University of Northern Iowa, his M.S.S.W. Social Work from the University of Wisconsin and PhD in Sociology from Florida State University.

== Career ==
Upon completing his PhD, Simons' first academic post was at Iowa State University, which he joined as an assistant professor in 1976. He was appointed a full professor there in 1986 and remained on the faculty there until 2002 when he became a professor of sociology at the University of Georgia (UGA). During his tenure at UGA, he was appointed a Distinguished Research Professor in the Department of Sociology. In 2013, he left UGA to become a Foundation Professor in Arizona State University's (ASU) School of Criminology and Criminal Justice with Leslie Gordon Simons. At ASU, Simons research "has the potential to reshape our understanding of antisocial behavior and the most effective policy responses to such problems." In recognition of his efforts, he was the recipient of the 2013 Outstanding Article Award for his article "Social Environment, Genes, and Aggression: Evidence Supporting the Differential Susceptibility Perspective."

Upon returning to UGA, Simons and Gordon Simons were named co-investigators for their project "Biomarkers of Health Risk Among African American Couples," funded through the National Institute of Child Health and Human Development. In recognition of his academic accomplishments, he was elected a Fellow of American Society of Criminology and received the SEC Faculty Achievement Award. During the COVID-19 pandemic in North America, Simons was appointed a Regents Professor in the department of sociology. He also received funding from the National Institute on Aging for his project "Economic, Social, and Health Consequences of COVID-19 Pandemic for Aging African Americans."
