= Symonds =

Symonds is a surname with English origins, derived from Simon. Notable people with the surname include:

== Arts, news, and entertainment ==
- Alan Symonds (1946–2006), American theatre technical director
- John Symonds (1914–2006), English biographer, playwright and author
- John Addington Symonds (1840–1893), English poet and literary critic and advocate of homosexual love
- Matthew Symonds (born 1953), English journalist
- Nelson Symonds (1933–2008), Canadian jazz guitarist
- Robert Symonds (1926–2007), American actor
- Ross Symonds (born 1942), Australian news presenter
- William R. Symonds (1851–1934), English painter

== Business and commerce ==
- Peter Symonds (c.1528–1586), English merchant and benefactor

== Education and academia ==
- Craig L. Symonds (1946–2026), American historian
- Richard Symonds (academic) (1918–2006), British UN administrator and academic

== Military ==
- James Symonds (born 1954), American naval officer
- Thomas Symonds (Royal Navy officer, died 1792) (1731–1792), British naval captain of the American Revolutionary War
- Thomas Symonds (Royal Navy officer, died 1894) (1811–1894), British admiral
- William Cornwallis Symonds (1810–1841), British army officer, Chief Magistrate of Auckland and Deputy Surveyor-General of New Zealand
- William Symonds (1782–1856), British ship designer and administrator, 'Surveyor of the Navy' 1832–1847

== Politics ==
- Jermyn Symonds (1816–1883), Member of Parliament in New Zealand
- Joseph Symonds (1900–1985), British politician, MP for Whitehaven
- Thomas Powell Symonds (1762–1819), British politician, MP for Hereford, and lieutenant colonel South Gloucester Militia
- Carrie Symonds (married name Carrie Johnson, born 1988), British media consultant, second wife of Boris Johnson
- Nick Thomas-Symonds (born 1980), British politician, MP for Torfaen

== Science ==
- Charles Symonds (1890–1978), English neurologist
- Percival Symonds (1893–1960), American educational psychologist
- William Samuel Symonds (1818–1887), English geologist

== Sports ==
- Andrew Symonds (1975–2022), Australian cricketer
- Calvin Symonds, Bermudian cricketer and footballer
- Chas Symonds (born 1982), English boxer
- Harry Symonds (cricketer) (1889–1945), Welsh cricketer
- Noel Symonds (1863–1943), English rower
- Pat Symonds (born 1953), British motorsport engineer
- Tom Symonds (born 1989), Australian rugby league player
- Tony Symonds (born 1962), Australian rules footballer

== Other ==
- John Alexander Symonds (born 1935), British police officer who spied for the KGB
- Joseph W. Symonds (1840–1918), Justice of the Maine Supreme Judicial Court
- Richard Symonds (diarist) (1617–1660), English royalist and Civil War diarist

== See also ==
- Peter Symonds College, Winchester, Hampshire, England
- Symonds Green, Stevenage, Hertfordshire, England
- Symonds Yat, village within the Forest of Dean, England
- Symonds Yat Rapids, canoeing facility on the River Wye, England
- Simmonds
- Simonds (disambiguation)
- Simmons (surname)
- Simons
