= Ronald Gene Simmons =

American mass murderer (1940–1990)

- Simmons (c. 1990)
- Born: July 15, 1940; Chicago, Illinois, U.S.
- Died: June 25, 1990 (aged 49); Cummins Unit, Arkansas, U.S.
- Spouse: Bersabe Rebecca "Becky" Ulibarri (m. 1960)
- Children: 7
- Status: Executed by lethal injection
- Convictions: Capital murder (two trials, 16 victims)
- Penalty: Death

Details
- Date: December 22–28, 1987
- Country: United States
- Locations: Rural Pope County and Russellville, Arkansas
- Killed: 16
- Injured: 4
- Weapons: Cord, fish stringer; H&R Model 929 .22-caliber revolver; Ruger Single Six .22-caliber revolver
- Military career
- Allegiance: United States
- Branch: US Navy (1957–62); US Air Force (1963–1979)
- Service years: 1957–1962 (USN); 1963–1979 (USAF)
- Rank: Master sergeant (USAF)
- Awards: Bronze Star Medal; Republic of Vietnam Gallantry Cross; Airforce Ribbon for Excellent Marksmanship

Ronald Gene Simmons Sr. (July 15, 1940 – June 25, 1990) was an American mass murderer and former military serviceman who perpetrated an attack that killed 16 people, including 14 members of his own family, over a week in December 1987 in Arkansas. The killings, centered at his home near Dover and later at several public locations in nearby Russellville, remain the deadliest familicide in United States history, and the second deadliest mass murder in Arkansas history, after the Elaine massacre of 1919. Simmons, a retired U.S. Navy and Air Force veteran, was convicted in two trials, sentenced to death, waived all appeals, and was executed by lethal injection in 1990 — the first person executed by that method in Arkansas. His refusal to appeal led to the U.S. Supreme Court case Whitmore v. Arkansas.

== Personal life and military career ==
Ronald Gene Simmons was born on July 15, 1940, in Chicago, Illinois, the second of three children born to Loretta and William Simmons. After his father died of a stroke in 1943, his mother married William D. Griffen, a civil engineer with the U.S. Army Corps of Engineers. The family relocated frequently due to Griffen's work, living in Pope County near Hector from 1946 to 1950, then in the Little Rock area, Albuquerque, and later California.

Relatives later described Simmons as violent and domineering from an early age. By the time he was 10 years old, he was reportedly bullying his younger sister and half-brother; family members said this behavior continued into adulthood, with his own children. Accounts from relatives portrayed him as quick-tempered, manipulative, and abusive toward both people and animals. His parents attempted to address the behavior by sending him to stay with family friends during the summers and later enrolling him in a Catholic boarding school near Searcy, but the problems persisted.

On September 5, 1957, Simmons dropped out of school and enlisted in the United States Navy. While stationed in Guam, he earned his GED, and in 1959 he was assigned as a yeoman at Naval Hospital Bremerton in Washington. During that period, he met Bersabe Rebecca "Becky" Ulibarri at a USO dance. The two married on July 9, 1960, in Raton, New Mexico, and eventually had seven children over the next 18 years.

Simmons left the Navy in 1962. He was briefly employed by Bank of America in San Francisco, then joined the U.S. Air Force in January 1963. Over the next two decades, he served as an administrative specialist on assignments in Virginia, California, England, Vietnam, and New Mexico. While stationed at Langley Air Force Base, Simmons' first child, Sheila, was born in 1963.

Simmons later transferred into the Air Force Office of Special Investigations; he was promoted to staff sergeant in 1966. After reenlisting, Simmons volunteered for duty in Vietnam in exchange for an AFOSI assignment in Saigon. He arrived in Vietnam in August 1967, and remained there through part of the Tet Offensive in early 1968.

During his 22-year military career, Simmons received several decorations, including the Bronze Star, the Republic of Vietnam Gallantry Cross, and the Air Force Small Arms Expert Marksmanship Ribbon. He retired from the Air Force on November 30, 1979, with the rank of master sergeant. Despite later revelations about his personal life, military evaluations consistently described his performance as exemplary, and his service record remained officially spotless throughout his career.

=== Dominance and control ===
Becky told her sister that Simmons' mother had warned her about his temper and his tendency to dominate those close to him. "She was always trying to tell me what Gene was like," Becky told her sister. "But I didn't listen."

At Simmons' insistence, Becky stopped wearing makeup and kept her hair tied back. He handled all outside household responsibilities, such as paying bills and buying groceries, while forbidding her from obtaining a driver's license or using a phone. She could only write to her family, but later, he denied her stamps, forcing her to ask others to mail her letters secretly. Simmons used distant post office boxes to censor the family's mail and required Becky to wear long dresses. Becky's sister, Viola O'Shields, noted, "Becky was not stupid by any means, but she was insecure. Ronald had made her believe that things were her fault, that she deserved what she got." "He cut her off from all of us, and now he's gone crazy... He wouldn't let her have a telephone, and he'd stand there if she ever made any calls from somewhere else."

Another sister, Edith Nesby, said the cruelty he employed often was more mental than physical. "He used to tell her she was dumb," Nesby said. "He'd tell Becky to say 'linoleum,' and when she'd mispronounce it, he'd laugh. He always had a mean streak."

Just before Simmons was executed in June 1990, Becky's brother, Manual Ulibarri, described him as an evil man who demanded complete control of his family.

=== New Mexico ===
From 1976 to 1981, the family lived on a 2-acre (0.81 ha) property in Wills Canyon near the small town of Cloudcroft, New Mexico.

In April 1976, after a four-year stint in the UK stationed at RAF Alconbury, Simmons was assigned to the Space and Missile Systems Organization (SAMSO) observatory in the Sacramento Mountains east of Alamogordo. The SAMSO Electro-Optical Research Facility focused its telescopes on Air Force communications satellites and detectors on high-flying aircraft. Located thirty-two miles from Holloman AFB, the observatory was a semiautonomous post with a personnel roster of one officer and seven enlisted personnel, with Simmons being the senior enlisted man. All had top secret security clearances.

In November 1976, the Air Force announced that it would place the observatory on "caretaker status" as soon as possible. As the site staff decreased, Simmons took on more responsibilities and was ultimately the last person to "turn out the lights" when the observatory was deactivated in June 1978. After this, Simmons was transferred to the 6585th Test Group at Holloman Air Force Base near Alamogordo.

On November 30, 1979, Simmons, who had over 20 years of service, retired from the Air Force when faced with the possibility of a promotion to Senior Master Sergeant (E-8) that would require extending his service obligation and a transfer to Turkey.

On May 5, 1981, Simmons began working as a GS-4 civil service employee at Holloman AFB.

==== Allegations, investigation, and charges ====
In 1981, Simmons was investigated for allegations of child sex abuse and for allegedly impregnating his 17-year-old daughter, Sheila. Social Services had been alerted anonymously on April 17, 1981. The district attorney at the time, Steven Sanders, stated that Simmons' son, R. Gene Simmons Jr., revealed to him that he was the informant. The son called two more times in the next three days, again anonymously. Additionally, authorities learned of the allegations through Sheila's friends, who had been told about the situation, and from school officials. One friend, Sheila Hiller, discovered that her friend was pregnant. "She wouldn't talk about it," Ms. Hiller said. "But I knew what had happened."

On April 20, a caseworker went to Cloudcroft to investigate rumors. In a private meeting, Sheila confirmed suspicions that she was pregnant with her father's child.

An assistant Otero County prosecutor was notified on April 21. Under threat of prosecution, Simmons eventually agreed to a program of psychological counseling for the whole family.

According to authorities, the initial incest had occurred in July 1980, in a hotel room in Phoenix when Simmons and Sheila were on their way from New Mexico to California for a coin show. While Simmons loved coin collecting, Sheila only pretended to enjoy it to please him.

According to social workers' investigations, at least two more instances occurred in September 1980. In March 1981, Sheila recognized she was pregnant and told her father. She gave birth to a daughter, Sylvia, on June 17, 1981.

A 1981 New Mexico Social Services report says that social workers tried to get legal custody of Simmons' four daughters after he insisted the family would raise the child he fathered with the eldest daughter. The report, dated June 8, 1981, asked District Attorney Sanders to seek a court order for custody of the children. Sanders later claimed an assistant district attorney never relayed the request to him.

Simmons and his family attended counseling for five weeks in 1981, but they stopped in June after their lawyer informed Simmons that anything he disclosed to social workers could be used against him in court. Once the counseling sessions ended, a criminal investigation began. On June 19, the District Attorney's office referred the case to the sheriff for further investigation.

Deputy Jeff Farmer drove to the Simmons property on June 20, 1981, where he met Sheila Simmons and her mother, Becky. Sheila refused to make any statement or comment. On July 6, school principal Everett Banister, who lived near the Simmons family, told Farmer that he had taken Sheila's homework assignments home and arranged her final exams.

Banister said he did not discuss the allegations with the family because social workers were handling the case. He said he took classwork to the Simmons home so she could graduate at the end of May and that the mother and her children were friendly, but Simmons was strange. He could not recall ever talking to Simmons, but did remember seeing him and his daughter Sheila riding down the road once. "She was sitting so close to him, like boyfriend-girlfriend instead of father-daughter." Others made similar observations.

Farmer's investigation ended July 11, 1981, after Farmer met with Simmons. Farmer said the younger Simmons would not talk about the incest allegation because his sister and mother asked him not to, but that the family was "well-satisfied" with its counseling session.

Sanders said Sheila Simmons ignored a grand jury subpoena and refused to discuss the incest with investigators until Sanders threatened her with contempt of court. Sheila reluctantly appeared on August 10 and testified against her father, telling the jurors that her father had intimate relations with her three times. Sanders said, "She testified for two hours. She broke down and cried. She said she didn't want her father to go to prison." Sheila's statements eventually led to a criminal charge and an arrest warrant.

On August 11, 1981, in Otero County, New Mexico, two months after Sheila gave birth to a daughter, Simmons was charged in New Mexico's 12th Judicial District with engaging in incest three times in September 1980 and could have faced up to nine years in prison if convicted. Sheriff's deputies planning to arrest Simmons arrived at the home 20 miles outside of Cloudcroft on August 11 to find the family had packed and moved away.

Abe DeLeon, Otero County manager for the New Mexico Human Services Department, said he received an anonymous tip that the Simmons family had gone to the Little Rock area. DeLeon then sent a "protective Service alert" about Simmons and the three incest charges filed against him to the Arkansas Human Service Department on March 17, 1982. Walt Patterson, deputy director of the Arkansas Human Services Department, said on December 31, 1987, that he couldn't find the letter that New Mexico said had been sent, and there was no reason for the department to act on an alert from New Mexico. The proper way to handle that would have been through law enforcement agencies, who might have traced Simmons through his military pension payments. Patterson said, "If we had been contacted by the Simmons family, we would have taken action on the New Mexico alert."

On December 31, 1987, Debby Nye, an attorney for the Arkansas Human Services Department, and other officials checked records and found that "to the best of our ability we cannot find that we have had any contact with that family." She said she could not locate a letter from New Mexico social services officials, but assumed it had arrived and that "protective service alerts" had been sent to every county office. Unless Simmons or someone in his family applied for food stamps, welfare, or other services, the department had no authority to look for them or to investigate for abuse.

The New Mexico incest charges were conditionally dismissed on August 10, 1982. Former DA Steven Sanders said he decided to withdraw the charges because the district court had verbally requested that he clear the docket of cases that were a year old and unlikely to be prosecuted, describing the procedure as a "general continuing thing to get rid of old cases." He also said the indictment was dismissed because officials had been unable to locate the family, and the only witness was the uncooperative daughter. He said Simmons' son, Gene (Ronald Jr.), told him in July 1982 that the family would return to New Mexico and undergo further counseling if the charges were dropped. Gene did not tell him where the family was living. Sanders also said the New Mexico Human Services Department didn't inform his office that the Simmons family might be in Arkansas. Otero County Sheriff Matt Matheney said that the sheriff's office hadn't been informed, either.

The dismissal included a provision allowing the charges to be reinstated if Simmons was arrested. The dismissal canceled the arrest warrant, and any information stored on the FBI's National Crime Information Center (NCIC) was dropped, leaving no trace.

=== Arkansas ===
Fearing arrest, Simmons fled with his family, first to Ward, Arkansas, where, starting September 30, 1981, he worked as a temporary filing clerk in the medical records division of the John L. McClellan Memorial Veterans Hospital, North Little Rock Division. On January 10, 1982, he took a permanent position as a personnel clerk at the 5th Army Medical Recruiting Battalion's Little Rock office.

Family life had nearly collapsed entirely for Simmons. Gene Jr. declined to relocate to Arkansas, opting instead to remain in New Mexico with high school friends. Following the incest allegations, Becky ceased sharing a bed with her husband.

While in Ward, Simmons impregnated Sheila a second time; the pregnancy was aborted this time by Dr. Chu Iy Tan in Dermott in early 1983.

Purchasing a small "farm too far from Little Rock to commute" on June 12, 1983, the family took up residence on a 13.72-acre (5.55 ha) tract of land in Pope County, 6.5 miles (10.5 km) north of Dover that they would dub "Mockingbird Hill." He quit the recruiting office job on August 5, 1983.

Friends and family noted that the relocation was influenced by an emerging relationship between Simmons' daughter, Sheila, and a young man named Dennis McNulty. Simmons had enrolled Sheila at the Draughon School of Business, blocks from the recruiting command where he was employed. Sheila and Dennis met in early 1983 at the school's snack bar. While Dennis studied radio communications, Sheila took secretarial courses to secure a job and gain independence from her parents' home. However, the Simmons family's move to Pope County did not stop McNulty. He regularly drove 170 miles round trip to court Sheila.

The Simmons property was 0.25 miles (0.40 km) east of Arkansas Highway 7 on a low ridge parallel to Broomfield Road, a paved county road. The property lay in Pleasant Grove, an unincorporated community north of Dover, with little else nearby besides a church, a cemetery, a corner store, and a campground.

Two days after the family moved in, a "No Trespassing" sign went up at the bottom of the road, followed soon after by a barbed-wire fence.

The property featured a five-bedroom mobile home, with two bedrooms in an attached wooden structure. Aside from a spacious family room with a fireplace, the rest of the house — including the kitchen, dining room, and bedrooms — was relatively small. The surrounding area was heavily wooded. A steep, rutted dirt driveway, with no trespassing signs and gates at the entrance, led to the house at the top of the low ridge, which was secluded from other houses in the area. All but the top of the trailer was hidden from view along Broomfield Road by a concrete block wall Simmons built. A neighbor said Loretta once told him, 'He put it there to keep people from looking up there.'

The home's heating and air-conditioning system was inoperable. The family room's wood-burning stove provided the only heat. Only one room had a window air conditioner. There was a phone, but Simmons wouldn't let it be hooked up because he didn't want the family to have uncontrolled outside contact. While the house had plumbing, the family used two nearby outhouses rather than repair a broken toilet. The home was surrounded by a makeshift privacy fence that was as high as 10 feet tall in some places. Several weeks before Christmas, Simmons had ordered his family to dig a new privy pit, which would eventually be where he disposed of some of their bodies.

While reconciling with Wilma, his estranged wife, Gene Jr. decided to have their three-year-old daughter, Barbara, temporarily stay with his parents until they could afford a new place. They planned to reunite and remarry in February 1988. Gene Jr. arrived at Mockingbird Hill on December 21. Wilma stayed in New Mexico for Christmas because she couldn't afford to travel to Arkansas for the visit.

Even at home, Simmons was a recluse who spent much of his time alone in his room. According to Edith Nesby, Becky's sister, "No one was allowed in his bedroom, not even Becky. He locked the door when he was in it, he locked the door when he was gone."

He was described variously as a reclusive loner, a quiet and stingy man, an unsmiling man with a piercing stare who compelled his children to perform heavy labor, such as carrying five-gallon containers of dirt to maintain a steep driveway. Loretta Simmons, 17, thought her father was a "drunken bum" and hated him, according to Summer Moon, a close friend and classmate who occasionally stayed overnight. Summer said that Loretta would insult him to his face and defy him. Moon said Simmons "had a beer in his hand all the time. He had one little room where he would stay all the time. It was dark and seemed spooky, and it stunk. Nobody ever went in there but him." It was the only room with an inside lock and had always been off-limits to the children.

In Pope County, Simmons worked a string of low-paying jobs, going from an "industrial" cleaner's job at the Atkins Pickle Company in Atkins from December 1983 to March 1984 to a "processor" job at a frozen food plant in Russellville. From January 1985 to November 19, 1986, Simmons worked as a clerk at Woodline Motor Freight in Russellville, processing checks and calling customers who were past due on their bills. According to Robert Wood, the company's president, Simmons quit under pressure to match the other clerks' performance. Joyce Butts, whom he later shot, was his immediate boss. Kathy Kendrick, whom he killed, had been a co-worker. People who worked with them said Simmons had affection for Kendrick, who was divorced, but that she spurned him and reported his attentions to her supervisors.

He worked part-time at the Sinclair Mini Mart on East Main Street in Russellville, both nights and weekends, for about 18 months before quitting on December 18, 1987. Russell "Rusty" Taylor owned the Mini Mart and had managed until the middle of 1986, when he leased it to David Salyer.

The number of people in the home had decreased to six. Gene Jr.—"Little Gene"—moved out before the family left New Mexico, later marrying Wilma Sue Pitts in Alamogordo on February 28, 1984. Sheila married Dennis McNulty on August 11, 1984, and moved to Camden, taking her daughter, Sylvia. William moved out after securing full-time hours at Hardee's in Russellville (where he had been a shift manager) in 1984. He married Renata May in October 1985, and the couple moved to Fordyce. The fourth oldest child, Loretta, was an honors student in the senior class at Dover High School. Set to graduate the following spring, she had made little effort to hide her desire to leave home at her first opportunity. After an evangelical service on December 3, 1987, she told friends that she was looking forward to leaving with her mother and starting college in the fall.

==== Christmas cards ====
Becky Simmons had sent Christmas cards to her siblings, each with a letter enclosed. Her sister, Edithe Nesby, said, "She was very happy. Her whole family was coming to see her." She was to have all of her children and grandchildren with her during the Christmas holiday. Abe Ulibarri, one of her brothers, said she spoke cheerfully about her family in the letter he received.

=== Weapons ===
Simmons owned two weapons. In 1968, while stationed with the Air Force OSI in San Francisco, he purchased a long-barreled Ruger .22-caliber revolver. On September 3, 1984, he bought a Harrington & Richardson nine-shot .22-caliber revolver with a three-inch barrel at a Walmart in Russellville. He took the two pistols with him on his December 1987 rampage in Russellville.

== Murders and attempted murders ==
Simmons' murders occurred in three phases. Two phases were at the Simmons home, and the third was in Russellville on the first workday after the Christmas weekend, where several others who survived were also shot.

=== Simmons' home (near Dover) ===
Investigators later concluded that in the weeks leading up to the 1987 Christmas holiday, Simmons made a calculated decision to methodically kill all members of his immediate family. He recognized it as the one time they would gather together in a short period. Several weeks earlier, he had instructed his children to dig a large hole, telling them it was for a new outhouse.

==== December 22, 1987 ====
On the morning of December 22, he first killed his wife Becky and eldest son Gene by bludgeoning them and shooting them with a .22-caliber pistol. He then killed his three-year-old granddaughter, Barbara, by strangulation.

Simmons dumped the bodies in the pit he had forced his children to dig for a new outhouse almost two months earlier.

Simmons then waited for his other children to return from school for Christmas break.

School bus driver Benny "Tiny" Huggins recalled dropping the Simmons children off at their drive that day.

Investigators believed that the Simmons children, Loretta, Eddy, Marianne, and Becky (ages 17, 14, 11, and 8), were separated. Each was strangled with a braided nylon fish stringer. The four children were subsequently dumped in the pit with the other bodies.

They were all wearing school clothes. Eddie had a lunch ticket in a pocket. The girls still had barrettes in their hair, and one of them had gum in her mouth. According to the autopsy, Loretta may have struggled trying to escape. Cuts on her face were consistent with being punched at least twice. Her watch and one earring were broken.

After he killed the family that had been living at home, Simmons made plans for what he was going to do in Russellville on Monday after the holiday weekend, got drunk, and went around the house, beating holes in the sheetrock walls and ceiling.

==== December 26, 1987 ====
Around midday on December 26, the remaining family members arrived at the home, as Simmons had invited them over for the holidays. It would have been the first time the entire family had been together in four years.

The first to be killed were Simmons' son, Billy, and his wife, Renata, who were both shot dead. Their 20-month-old son, Trae, was strangled. Simmons also shot and killed his oldest daughter, Sheila (whom he had sexually abused), and her husband, Dennis McNulty. Simmons then strangled his child, Sheila's seven-year-old daughter, Sylvia Gail, and finally, his 21-month-old grandson, Michael. Simmons laid the bodies of his whole family in neat rows in the lounge. Their bodies were covered with coats, except Sheila's, which was covered by Becky Simmons' best tablecloth. The bodies of Trae and Michael were wrapped in plastic sheeting and left in abandoned cars at the end of the lane.

The older six relatives had been shot as many as seven times each.

On Christmas Eve, Simmons drove to a Sears store in Russellville, where he retrieved Christmas gifts that he had previously ordered for his family. About 1 a.m., December 26, he went out to drink at North 40, a private club in Russellville, before returning home. Since Pope County was a dry county, alcoholic beverages were only available in "private" clubs.

=== Russellville ===
On the morning of December 28, the first Monday after Christmas, Simmons wrote a short letter, stuck it in an envelope with $250, and addressed it to his mother-in-law, May Novak. "Dear Ma, sometimes you reap many more times what you sow. This is just a little token of our appreciation. Keep it in remembrance of us. Love, Gene."

Then, armed with two .22-caliber revolvers, Simmons drove a car belonging to his oldest son, Ronald Gene Simmons Jr., to Russellville.

Simmons had meticulously mapped out his murderous route in town. At some point along the way, he mailed the letter and two other letters with almost identical wording, along with money, to two nieces. All had a December 28, 1987, Russellville postmark.

Robert Wood, who witnessed one of the shootings, said, "He definitely looked for who he wanted to shoot." Wood also said that Simmons had worked at or knew people at each of the places where the shootings occurred.

==== Law office ====
His first target was Kathy Cribbins Kendrick at Peel, Eddy, and Gibbons Law Firm, near the town center on South Glenwood Avenue. Simmons had been infatuated with Kendrick when they both worked at Woodline Motor Freight Company, but she had rejected him. After walking into the office, he shot and killed Kendrick with four shots to the head. She died a short time later at St. Mary's Regional Medical Center. A divorcee, she had worked for the firm for three months.

As he left, someone called the police department. It was about 10:17 AM.

==== Oil company ====
Traveling on side streets instead of Main Street, which would have been more direct, Simmons went to the office of Taylor Oil Company at 2601 West Main Street, intending to kill owner Russell "Rusty" Taylor, who had once been Simmons' employer at the Sinclair Mini Mart. He shot and wounded Taylor in the right arm and left side of his chest and killed James David Chaffin, a firefighter and delivery driver for Taylor, with one shot to the head at point-blank range. Chaffin was a stranger to Simmons. He had just returned from a car fire when he encountered Simmons. After the shooting, Simmons fired at a clerk, Juli Money, who escaped by ducking behind boxes, initially thinking she had been shot. When officers arrived, she gave a detailed description of Simmons and his vehicle. The second shooting was reported at 10:27 a.m.

In an interview at St. Mary's Regional Medical Center on December 31, 1987, Rusty Taylor said he had no recollection of any dispute and had not had contact with Simmons in over a year. Taylor's mother, Mary Taylor, said Taylor had turned down Simmons' request for a raise because he was only a part-timer. Simmons quit on December 18, 1987.

==== Convenience store ====
Simmons then drove back 3.1 miles through downtown to the Sinclair Mini Mart at 2400 East Main Street. The third call came in to the police department at 10:39 a.m.

Store manager David Salyer was shot once in the forehead and employee Roberta Woolery was shot once in the jaw. Salyer was in the back of the store drinking coffee with a customer, Tony Carta, when Simmons walked up to Woolery, who was working the register. Simmons and Woolery exchanged words, and then Simmons pulled out a pistol from under his dark coat and fired twice. Salyer thought it was a joke until Woolery screamed. Salyer grabbed a chair, moved toward Simmons, and threw the chair at him. He said that he thought that Simmons had fired five shots in the store. Two were fired at Salyer, once from near the cash register and again from no more than three or four feet. Salyer believed the second shot struck the chair and then hit him over the left eye, but didn't penetrate very far into his head.

At trial, Woolery said she recognized Simmons as soon as he turned and faced her before he shot.

Salyer later testified, "When he squeezed the very first shot, he was grinning." Carta testified that he ran behind some showcases after the first shot and that he was "picking up six-packs of soda and throwing them at him (Simmons), and hollering and cussing and everything else."

==== Freight company ====
His final target was the office of the Woodline Motor Freight Company on Bernard Way, where he shot his former supervisor, Joyce Butts, in the head and chest. She later testified that she had no memory of the shooting and that, as his supervisor, they had once argued over Simmons' pay. She would also testify that she had to undergo open-heart surgery to remove a bullet and that she had been left partially paralyzed on her left side. He then ordered one of the employees, Vicky Jackson, at gunpoint to call the police, telling her, "I've come to do what I wanted to do. It's all over now. I've gotten everybody who wanted to hurt me." Over the next 2½ years, through his execution, Simmons maintained a stony silence about the murders.

==== Surrender and arrest ====
When the police arrived, Russellville Police Chief Herb Johnston entered the building unarmed and alone. Simmons handed over his gun, an H&R Model 929 .22-caliber revolver, and surrendered without any resistance. The Ruger was in a paper bag placed on a desk. Ballistics tests would show that the pistol Simmons handed to Johnston was the same weapon used to kill five relatives.

Within a minute of his arrest, Simmons was advised of his rights and asked for his name. He replied, "James Johnson." When asked if he understood his rights, he said, "Yes." That was the last thing he uttered. He had a billfold, but it contained no identification.

Johnston said Simmons refused to provide any information. Officers learned his identity from witnesses who knew him, including that Simmons was a retired Air Force master sergeant. State Police Sgt. Dan Short said, according to witnesses, that Simmons had been wearing a long black coat and cowboy hat at the law office where Kendrick was shot, but when arrested, he was wearing a blue jacket and blue ball cap.

After his first trial, his attorney, John Harris, substantiated Simmons' intent, saying his client never intended to survive, that he intended to take his life after the Russellville shootings, but didn't "because of the trouble he was having killing people. He shot seven people—only two of them died." Harris also said Simmons expected to be killed at the first scene, the law firm, by police or a firm employee. While he did receive an Air Force Ribbon for small arms marksmanship, Simmons had told Harris that he was not a hunter and was not familiar with guns.

Throughout the 45-minute-long rampage, "wielding" two revolvers, Simmons had killed two and wounded four others and briefly held a woman hostage.

=== Investigation and charges ===
After Simmons was taken into custody, he refused to talk or respond to any questions about his family and shook his head "no" to a request to search his home. Witnesses in Russellville told investigators that Simmons had a large family. From Simmons' employee records, deputies learned the location of the family home, and Pope County Sheriff's Investigator James Hardy was sent to the home to conduct a welfare check on Simmons' family.

Hardy arrived at 12:42 p.m. Three cars sat in the yard. They would prove to be the property of Ronald Gene Simmons, William Simmons, and Dennis McNulty.

Hardy knocked on the glass front door, but there was no answer. He circled the house once. Finding no other entrance, he returned to the glass door and saw that it had been blocked from the inside by a handle wedged in the lower track.

With no search warrant, Hardy returned to Russellville.

==== Discoveries at the home ====
The sheriff's office called Deputy Prosecuting Attorney Don Bourne to ask for advice. Bourne considered Simmons' family's status a "valid emergency," determined that Circuit Judge John S. Patterson was out of town, and relayed that information to Prosecuting Attorney John Bynum, who decided a search warrant was not needed. Bynum reasoned that since Simmons wounded four people, he "wasn't a very good shot" and members of Simmons' family, if shot, might still be alive, but in imminent danger of death.

The sheriff determined that an emergency search was warranted. Bolin later testified that one reason for entering the home was because tears formed in Simmons' eyes and his lips quivered when he asked about his family.

Bolin and deputies went to the Simmons home on Broomfield Road, about 16 miles north of Russellville, because "We were thinking in terms of what a man like this would do." The house's only outside door, a sliding glass door, was barred from the inside by a broom handle inserted in the lower track. They entered the residence shortly before 3 p.m., after Sheriff Bolin, without a warrant, gained access through an unlocked window on the south side of the residence. A deputy, Ray Caldwell, later said the entry was made to determine if "anybody was alive."

The bodies of William and Renata Simmons and Sheila, Dennis, and Sylvia McNulty were found inside. They had apparently been killed immediately upon arrival, as they were still wearing coats when found. The adults had each been shot, but the young girl, found lying face-down on a bed in the rear bedroom, did not have a bullet wound.

One investigator followed Caldwell with a video camera borrowed from the Arkansas State Police as he entered every room. R. Gene Simmons' room was the last to be entered. It was locked until Sheriff Bolin kicked it in. The only room with an air conditioner, it had shelves lined with books, reel-to-reel tapes, and behind a curtain, imported beer and gourmet food, such as canned oysters—luxuries he hoarded.

Bolin commented later that electricity to the house had been turned off and that victims might have been dead for several days since unopened presents were found under the tree. Other gifts, also unopened, were found in closets.

Pope County Sheriff Jim Bolin said that Simmons' wife, four of their children, aged 7 to 17, and four grandchildren were unaccounted for.

On December 29, officers obtained a warrant to continue searching. Members of the Pope County Marine Rescue Unit initially dragged a small pond north of the residence, but their focus soon turned to a mound of freshly turned earth covered with corrugated metal roughly 40 yards southwest of the house. At 8:30 a.m., deputies and state troopers began digging with picks and shovels, and an electric winch was used to remove coils of barbed wire from what proved to be a mass grave. The first body was discovered about two feet below the surface at 9:12 a.m., when a mat of black hair was found. It was Loretta. Kerosene had been poured over the bodies, though it had not been set on fire. Bolin said the bodies were "just piled in" with heads pointing in the same direction and that the grave was six to seven feet long, 36 to 40 inches wide, and four to four-and-a-half feet deep. The digging stopped at 9:37 a.m. Seven bodies had been found.

Bolin said that some of those found in the grave were wearing pajamas.

Other searchers then discovered the bodies of two children wrapped in taped green garbage bags in the trunks of two abandoned cars about 125 yards northwest of the house. Of the 14 bodies, six were shot and eight were strangled "with cord." Testimony and video in the trial identified the cords used were fish stringers.

Sheriff Bolin said walls and the ceiling in the house had been punched-in in places by what looked like blows from a heavy metal tool, such as a wrecking bar. Attorney John Harris recalled Simmons telling him he used a hammer.

On December 29, 1987, Sheriff Bolin told a reporter, "He's done nothing in his cell other than lay in his bunk with his face to the wall, just laying there." Circuit Court Judge John G. Patterson held a probable cause hearing for Simmons, who wouldn't answer any questions. He wouldn't even nod or shake his head. Frustrated, Patterson ordered Simmons held without bond and appointed two local lawyers, John Harris and Robert E. "Doc" Irwin, as his defense attorneys. Russellville Police Chief Herb Johnston filed documents supporting charging Simmons with two counts of capital murder and four of attempted capital murder.

Prosecutor John Bynum filed two counts of capital murder and four counts of attempted murder on December 30 for the victims shot in Russellville, saying he would seek to have Simmons executed if he were found guilty on the capital charges. "Under the circumstances, I think it is the appropriate punishment if a jury finds him guilty," he said... "The murders were cruel and senseless. It was just a cold-blooded deal." He also said he would eventually file charges against Simmons in the deaths of his fourteen family members.

Bolin said the investigation was hindered by Simmons' reclusive nature, noting that after five years in the area, he appeared to have neither close friends nor even casual acquaintances.

On December 30, the FBI joined the sheriff's office and the Arkansas State Police in the investigation due to its expertise in tracking out-of-state witnesses and conducting background checks. Authorities ordered Simmons' safe deposit box at Peoples Bank & Trust sealed. A bank attorney told authorities that bank records showed Simmons opened the box several times during the Christmas holidays.

A charge of attempted capital murder was filed on January 13, 1988, for shooting at Juli Money at Taylor Oil Company, where Rusty Taylor was wounded and James Chaffin was killed. Simmons was also charged with kidnapping Vickie Jackson at Woodline Motor Freight, whom he had held hostage briefly in an office.

Simmons was charged with two counts of capital murder in the deaths of 14 family members on January 15. One count was for the seven family members killed before Christmas. The other count was for the seven killed on December 26, 1987. Bynum said two separate charges were filed because the family slayings were "two separate episodes."

The charges were filed after Prosecuting Attorney John Bynum received information from autopsies of the victims and ballistic results from the state crime lab. The results showed that eight of the victims died from strangulation, and five of the family members had been shot by the .22-caliber pistol that Simmons surrendered when he was arrested on December 28. The bullet fragments that killed William H. Simmons could not be positively identified.

Bynum said he would seek the death penalty for the sixteen deaths. Attorney John Harris filed for a change of venue on February 23. He has said that widespread publicity could jeopardize Simmons' right to a fair trial.

Despite outstanding warrants in New Mexico on charges of incest, Simmons had passed a background check when he was hired as a military personnel clerk at the 5th Army's Little Rock Battalion recruiting office. On December 30, 1987, Dave McNully, public affairs officer for the Little Rock office of the Corps of Engineers, said Simmons' fingerprints, along with a history of his activities, were sent to the Office of Personnel Management in Boyers, Pennsylvania, in early 1982, with no discrepancies found. Permanent federal employment required an FBI fingerprint check.

=== Autopsy results, victim identification, and other evidence ===
State Medical Examiner Fahmy Malak said on December 30 that positive identifications had been made for all 16 bodies.

The same day, Becky Simmons' family said they would arrange cremations for the bodies of family members not claimed by in-laws.

On December 31, 1987, Bolin announced preliminary autopsy results for 14 bodies found at the Simmons residence. Eight were strangled, and six were shot. Becky Simmons, 46, was shot twice in the head; Gene Jr., 26, four times in the head and once in the abdomen; Sheila, 24, six times in the head; Dennis McNulty, 33, once in the head; William H. Simmons II twice in the head; Renata five times in the head and twice in the neck. Bolin noted some bodies had cords around their necks. Bolin said blood was found on the ceiling, walls, and floor of a rear bedroom, including a bloody handprint, and that, if there was a struggle, it was probably Gene Jr. fighting for his life. He said Mrs. Simmons was placed in the grave first, followed by the oldest son, Gene. Bolin also stated that it would have taken only three to seven minutes to strangle each child, and it could have been done quietly.

Bolin also observed,

- The shallow grave had been covered with corrugated iron sheets
- A fuel, possibly kerosene, was splattered on the grave.
- Simmons censored all outgoing and incoming mail and, apparently, would not allow Becky to have postage stamps. Simmons had a post office box in Russellville.
- Simmons apparently wouldn't allow his wife or daughters to wear makeup.
- Because of the incest charges, Simmons and his wife apparently hadn't slept together since they left New Mexico.
- There was a phone in the house, but Simmons wouldn't have it hooked up.
- The only heat was a wood-burning stove. A heating and air conditioning system existed, but it was inoperable.

On January 5, 1988, Prosecutor John Bynum stated that the gun used to kill Kathy Kendrick and J.D. Chaffin in Russellville was also used to kill Sheila, Simmons' daughter. Ballistics tests confirmed that bullets found in their bodies were fired from the same .22-caliber pistol. In May 1988, ballistic expert Paul McDonald testified that the bullets from the Sinclair Mini Market matched those fired from the nine-shot revolver surrendered by Simmons, used in the killings of Kendrick and Chaffin. The bullets were 22-caliber hollow points.

During the trial for the family's deaths, Dr. Bennett Preston, the former assistant state medical examiner, testified that all adult victims had been fatally shot, while all minor victims had been strangled using a type of rope.

==== Victims ====
The autopsy results showed that the victims died from gunshots or strangulation.

Date	Name	Age	Relationship	Cause of death
December 22, 1987
December 22, 1987	Ronald Gene Simmons Jr.	26	Son	Gunshot
December 22, 1987	Bersabe Rebecca Simmons	46	Wife	Gunshot
December 22, 1987	Barbara Sue Simmons	3	Granddaughter (daughter of Ronald Gene Simmons Jr.)	Strangulation
December 22, 1987	Loretta Simmons	17	Daughter	Strangulation
December 22, 1987	Eddy Simmons	14	Son	Strangulation
December 22, 1987	Marianne Simmons	11	Daughter	Strangulation
December 22, 1987	Rebecca "Becky" Simmons	8	Daughter	Strangulation
December 26, 1987
December 26, 1987	William "Billy" Simmons II	22	Son	Gunshot
December 26, 1987	Renata (Note: Some sources spell her name "Renada.") Lynne May Simmons	21	Daughter-in-Law	Gunshot
December 26, 1987	William H. "Trae" Simmons III	1	Grandson	Strangulation
December 26, 1987	Sheila Simmons McNulty	24	Daughter	Gunshot
December 26, 1987	Dennis McNulty	33	Son-in-Law	Gunshot
December 26, 1987	Sylvia Gail McNulty	6	Granddaughter/Daughter	Strangulation
December 26, 1987	Michael McNulty	1	Grandson	Strangulation
December 28, 1987
December 28, 1987	Kathleen "Kathy" Kendrick	24	Acquaintance	Gunshots (4)
December 28, 1987	James David "Jim" Chaffin	33	Stranger	Gunshot

=== Motives ===
Despite the scale and brutality of his crimes, no definitive official analysis of Simmons' motives was ever developed. There were various reasons for this, including:

- Simmons' refusal to cooperate or appeal: He provided no clear explanation or confession, remaining largely silent about his reasons. After both trials, Simmons explicitly waived his right to appeal.
- Swift justice: Given the strong evidence and Simmons' refusal to appeal, there was little need to concentrate on why he did it. The rapid timeline—less than three years from crime to execution, with convictions in two separate trials—left little room for prolonged inquiry.
- Limited psychological evaluation: While Simmons underwent a competency evaluation to determine his ability to stand trial, this assessment focused narrowly on his sanity and capacity to understand the proceedings—not on a comprehensive analysis of his motives.
- Complexity and ambiguity of motives: The evidence from the crime scenes, witness statements, and limited documentation suggests a tangle of potential motives, none of which were conclusively explored due to Simmons' silence and the lack of follow-up investigation.
- Legal and social context: The legal system in Arkansas at the time prioritized swift justice over exhaustive motive analysis, especially given Simmons' willingness to accept his fate.
- Lack of collateral evidence: Unlike many high-profile killers, Simmons left no manifesto, diary, or correspondence explaining his motives. Family members who might have provided insight were either dead or unable to offer more than speculation, hampering official efforts to establish a motive

=== Simmons' abusive control and the threat of the family's growing resistance ===
In New Mexico, Simmons exerted complete control over his family, subjecting them to relentless abuse—primarily verbal, but at times physical. He first struck his wife in front of their children in 1978. After school and on weekends, the kids mostly went out and collected rocks as they built a stone wall around the property. The eldest daughter, Sheila, endured the worst of it, suffering sexual abuse at his hands.

According to attorney John Harris, when the family fled New Mexico, Simmons became a fugitive with a felony warrant hanging over him. Unbeknownst to him, New Mexico had ceased pursuing that warrant, and the case became inactive in 1982. Simmons remained convinced that an active warrant for his arrest was still outstanding. As a result, his grip on the family tightened, and the abuse escalated. Financial struggles and personal failures deepened his obsessions, pushing him further into isolation and tightening his oppressive control over those trapped under his rule.

Simmons confided to Harris that he was concerned that his wife might divorce him, and that would be the end of everything with his record (the incest charges). He had substantial debt and had quit his remaining part-time job. Becky had a lump in her breast that compounded his worries.

According to his children's schoolmates, Simmons kept a tight rein on his family, especially his wife and 17-year-old daughter. While the children were all talented in school, they were intensely shy and reluctant to discuss family life. In two letters that Lorreta managed to get out to a friend, Karen Warnick, she said she was depressed by her home life and limited access to friends. She wrote, "My dad hates me, says I'm not good enough, yet claims I'm conceited. And you can't talk to my mom about anything, she doesn't understand." Loretta asked her friend to come visit, that Loretta's parents wouldn't mind, and provided directions to the house.

According to family acquaintance Linda Mayhew, the children had a strained relationship with their father and preferred his absence. "They didn't like him at all," she said, and that the children had hideouts on the Simmons property to avoid him when he was home. Linda's daughter, Jennifer, noted that the children favored the periods when he worked two jobs, and their mother remarked that they'd be content if he worked "seven days a week, 24 hours a day." Mrs. Mayhew sometimes visited with Becky at the Simmons home while Mr. Simmons was at work and their children played outside, but said she was not close to Mrs. Simmons, who was never allowed to visit anyone. Jennifer only spent the night there twice and didn't enjoy either visit because of Simmons' strict rules about keeping quiet. She said that none of the kids liked him.

According to Mrs. Mayhew, the Simmons home was a pleasant place. Dozens of pet chickens, dogs, and geese roamed. Mrs. Simmons' garden had a sign, "Mom's playpen," hanging in front of it.

Mrs. Mayhew said she seldom spoke to Simmons. "I never probably said six words to him; he wasn't one for small talk," she said. "He was the type that when he was looking at you, he didn't see you; he would see right through you."

Becky Simmons stayed with her husband out of fear, according to her sister, Edith Nesby, on December 30, 1987. "I think she was afraid to leave," said Mrs. Nesby. "She was a woman with small children and no work skills. She was too ashamed to turn to her family after the sexual abuse thing. She was just afraid, and she didn't know what to do." Nesby said that Becky had been physically abused by Simmons and that the children tried to protect her during the beatings. Nesby said Simmons hated her because she did not like the way he dominated her sister. Simmons wouldn't stay in the same room with her during Nesby's last visit. His only words to her were, "I understand you're leaving, goodbye." Mrs. Nesby said her husband, Pat, didn't like for her to visit the family, warning her, "Something is going to happen to that man someday and he's going to kill his family and I don't want you there." On January 1, Mae Novak, Becky's mother, said Becky came to visit in Colorado with the youngest, but the other children didn't go. "I imagine he did that so she wouldn't leave him or something," she said.

During the investigation, local residents expressed shock over the discovery. Edna Baker, a longtime resident, described it as "the worst thing since the Civil War" to happen in Pleasant Grove. Neighbors recalled seeing Simmons supervising his children as they gathered mud and stones to fill ruts in their driveway—a memory that resurfaced for some, including Ron Standridge, upon learning of the tragedy. A pastor from a nearby church said, "I didn't know them. Nobody around here knew them. They kept to themselves."

In a 1987 press briefing on December 31, Pope County sheriff's investigators suggested that Ronald Gene Simmons Sr. may have been driven to rage by his wife Becky's secret plans to leave and divorce him due to the sexual and physical abuse the family endured from Simmons. Summer Mooney, a friend of Loretta, said Loretta told her that her mother had been thinking of leaving with the children for years, but the only thing stopping her was that she was afraid she would not be able to support her children. Most recently, Mrs. Simmons had spoken about going to San Antonio, where the oldest son, Gene, lived. Earlier in the week, relatives of Mrs. Simmons speculated that the killing spree might have been sparked by a decision by Becky to leave and take the children or that Gene Simmons Jr. might take his mother and siblings away

In the briefing, Bolin acknowledged they didn't yet have tangible evidence to link Simmons to the slaying of the family members, but expected that would come from tests being conducted at the state Crime Laboratory at Little Rock. The state medical examiner's office told him that it would be a week to 10 days before the final autopsy results would be available. The sheriff stated that he requested every possible test.

The first tangible link connecting Simmons to the murders of his family came 8 days after he was arrested. Ballistic tests showed that a gun taken from Simmons had fired a bullet removed from the body of his daughter, Sheila McNulty.

In Russellville, witnesses told them Simmons harbored personal grudges against victims shot in Russellville and that he had an unrequited amorous infatuation with Kathy Kendrick, who had rejected repeated advances and filed a sexual harassment complaint against Simmons.

The three oldest siblings, all adults who had left home, worked together to convince Becky to leave Simmons.

In a summer 1987 four-page handwritten letter from Becky Simmons to her son, William, and his wife, Renata, she wrote, in part, "I am a prisoner here and the kids too ... Dad has had me like a prisoner ...." "I don't want to live the rest of my life with Dad." "Every time I think of freedom I want out as soon as possible." The slain wife of R. Gene Simmons was contemplating leaving, but worried she could not find a job, so she decided to wait. "God is telling me to be more patient, Right now I'll just say (I'll) do some checking and then it will help me make my decision." "I know when I get out I might need help, Dad has had me like a prisoner, that the freedom might be hard for me to take, yet I know it would be great, having my children visit me anytime, having a telephone, going shopping if I want, going to church." The letter was published in the Arkansas Democrat and the Arkansas Gazette on January 3, 1988.

In the letter, Becky Simmons wrote that she wanted Loretta to move in with William and Renata after the teen turned 18. "She wants to go to college and she can get a job, too.

A friend of 17-year-old Loretta said that Loretta told her that her mother had been thinking about leaving with the children because of Simmons' repressive and abusive behavior, that the only thing stopping her was that she was afraid she wouldn't be able to support the children, and, most recently, Mrs. Simmons had talked about going to San Antonio, where Loretta's brother, Gene Jr., was living.

In a September 29, 1987, letter to Sheila, Becky wrote,

Billy, I know, worries over me so I've been doing a lot of thinking of leaving your dad. I've been a prisoner long enough. Bill and I are trying to find a way. I just don't want to give your dad anything. He has mistreated us all long enough, so I feel no pity for him, and being alone is what he deserves. All this will take time but I don't want to continue this life with Fatso.

Becky often referred to Gene as "Fatso" in letters that didn't get mailed through him.

We found his shells for his gun on the ground outside (a) couple days later. I gave them to him and told him if he ever tried pointing a gun at us, I would get him for assault with a deadly weapon.

In one letter, Becky said she was a prisoner and yearned for freedom. In another, she wrote, "Another thing I always try to remember, a man who hates suffers more than the man hated." Those words were read on January 2, 1988, at a memorial service in Russellville for the 14 family members who were killed.

Becky Simmons' family said they didn't trust Simmons because he seemed to get stranger and stranger each year. Becky's older sister, Viola O'Shields, said, "He was a very loving man at one time. He loved his family." Viola said Becky explained her daily prayers and bible reading by saying she did it "because I don't want to meet him (Simmons) in hell." Manual Ulibarri, her brother, said Simmons had his sister "so isolated so she couldn't go anywhere or do anything. The only time she could go out was to wash clothes." "Gene never liked his stepfather," said his sister-in-law, Edith Nesby. "Actually, he didn't like anybody. ... Anything that went wrong was always somebody else's fault." She said that Becky stayed with him for the children's sake and "as a martyr to a crappy marriage."

"In my heart, I think I know the reason why. Like told you before, he just had lost control of the family. He couldn't bear to be with... Like a general, he had to have control all the time," said Manual. "After the incest he lost control. My sister Becky was sleeping in the room with the girls.... Gene just lost control of the family and couldn't take it. In other words, they just didn't have anything to do with him and he couldn't take it." Ulibarri said that another factor that prompted the family massacre was Simmons' belief his family was planning to leave him. "Gene thought he (Ronald Gene Simmons Jr.) was coming to pick up the family and take them with him back to San Antonio."

=== News anchor and a local reporter ===
Simmons initiated communication with KTHV news anchor Anne Jansen through a letter, leading to an exchange consisting of eight letters from Simmons and four two- to three-hour conversations. These interactions occurred twice at the Pope County Detention Center, once at the Tucker Unit and once at the Cummins Unit. Simmons asked Jansen to keep their discussions confidential, emphasizing that he would have stopped communicating if he believed they were intended for journalistic use.

In their initial conversation, Jansen noted Simmons' pronounced paranoia. He expressed suspicion that even unsecured objects, such as light bulbs and wall switches, might conceal listening devices. He remained highly vigilant, consistently monitoring his surroundings.

Simmons also communicated with another reporter, Laura Shull of the Russellville Courier Democrat, including once from his Pope County jail cell.

=== Surrender versus suicide ===
Defense Attorney John Harris said Simmons told him he contemplated committing suicide after his spree in Russellville. He also thought about turning the pistol towards the police to have them shoot him. After several shots from the .22-caliber pistols failed to kill multiple victims—he shot seven people in Russellville, and only two died—he worried that using them for suicide might leave him disabled instead. He also doubted his chances of dying if he tried to shoot it out with the police.

== Criminal proceedings and aftermath ==
=== State Hospital observation and evaluation ===
On December 30, 1987, without publicity, Simmons was transferred from the Pope County Detention Center to the Arkansas State Hospital in Little Rock after Circuit Judge John Patterson ordered him held without bond and to undergo a psychiatric observation and evaluation. Despite a backlog of admissions, Simmons was immediately admitted on an emergency basis at Rogers Hall, which housed the criminally insane, arriving there under heavy security because of threats on his life. Dr. Roy Ragsdale said patients could be admitted quickly if their behavior was psychotic or they were charged with a capital crime. Acting Director Dr. Paula Lynch said that Simmons would be kept in a private cell in a cell block, accompanied by security, and under observation on a 24-hour basis.

The hospital was asked to find the answers to two questions:

- Is Ronald Gene Simmons competent to stand trial?
- At the time he was alleged to have killed 16 persons, "could he appreciate right and wrong and could he have had a choice in the matter?"

On January 28, Judge Patterson signed an order granting the State Hospital a 30-day extension to complete its examination of Simmons after staff psychiatrist Dr. Irving Kuo requested an additional period "for further observation and evaluation before making a final diagnosis."

Following sixty days at the State Hospital, on February 29, 1988, Dr. Roy Ragsdale, the hospital director, said that Simmons was competent to stand trial and was responsible for his actions at the time of the killings. Ragsdale said that Simmons was diagnosed as having a mixed personality disorder "with narcissistic and paranoid features." "It is a clinical way of describing coping techniques in dealing with his feelings and stress." Ragsdale said hospital staff concluded that Simmons could distinguish right from wrong and could conform his conduct to the requirements of the law.

=== Pretrial proceedings ===
That same day, Sheriff Bolin and Lt. Jay Winters returned Simmons to Pope County, and Judge Patterson accepted the state hospital's findings. Patterson set a May 9 trial date. Bolin said Simmons would remain in one of the 53-cell jail's four maximum-security cells due to prior threats on his life.

Simmons' two lawyers, appointed by Judge Patterson, had served as public defenders until Patterson determined Simmons was not indigent.

At a hearing on March 7, Patterson said he would be "hard-pressed" to classify Simmons as indigent because he received a military pension of about $917 per month. He ruled that Simmons could pay for his defense, and his attorneys had accrued about $11,000 in fees and expenses. Prosecutor Bynum objected to the defense's request for payment, stating that it would deplete the county's indigent defense fund, which held only $15,278 in February. Everything of value that Simmons had eventually went to his attorneys, including concrete blocks from the wall that had shielded the house from view on Broomfield Road and Christmas gifts that had never been opened. Before the hearing, Simmons had signed a document authorizing the post office to release his mail to his attorneys.

In a plea arraignment on March 24, 1989, Simmons pleaded innocent to four capital murder charges, five counts of attempted capital murder, and one count of kidnapping. He spoke for the first time in court since his arrest, saying, "I respectfully request my right to a speedy trial on all charges."

In the same hearing, acting on a request by Simmons' attorneys, Judge Patterson ruled that the trial for the Russellville spree would take place in Ozark, in Franklin County. Defense lawyers argued that the case should be moved out of Pope County because of the extensive media coverage it had already received. Under Arkansas law, the trial could be transferred only within the Fifth Judicial District, where the crimes occurred, which includes Pope, Johnson, and Franklin counties. Ozark, in Franklin County, was as far from Pope County as the venue could be moved while remaining within the Fifth Judicial District.

Patterson ruled that the charges for the murders of the 14 members of Simmons' family would be tried separately after the first trial was concluded. Simmons' attorneys reserved the right to later change the plea to "not guilty by reason of insanity." They also filed several motions, including:

- Suppression of evidence obtained from the home. Prosecuting Attorney Bynum said that none of the physical evidence from the home would be used at trial. Patterson scheduled a hearing to discuss suppressing the physical evidence.
- Charging Simmons on three separate murder counts could result in three death penalties. Bynum said he had no objection to consolidating the Dover cases, but that the Russellville case had to be tried separately.

The question of Simmons' indigence was raised again, and "heated words" were exchanged between Patterson and the defense. John Harris said the defense lacked funds for various psychological and laboratory tests. Patterson told the defense that anyone receiving a $917 pension was not indigent, and if they didn't want to continue the case, Simmons, "in two hours' time, could have a flock of attorneys" attracted by the notoriety of the case.

A hearing to discuss the suppression of evidence was held on April 4. Paul McDonald, chief firearms examiner for the state Crime Laboratory, testified that bullets recovered from the bodies of Kathy Kendrick and James Chaffin came from the revolver Simmons handed Police Chief Herb Johnston when he surrendered. Dr. Bennett Preston, assistant state medical examiner, said Kendrick was killed by four gunshots to the head and Chaffin by a gunshot to the right eye. Ten witnesses testified to the authenticity of the items seized as evidence and how they were obtained. Circuit Judge John Patterson declined to suppress any of the evidence submitted by the prosecution.

On April 5, Judge Patterson issued an order prohibiting prosecutors in any trial from presenting evidence involving past criminal charges against Simmons.

=== Trial for Russellville shootings ===
In his first trial, Simmons was charged with murdering Kendrick and Chaffin, attempting to murder five others, and kidnapping a sixth on December 28, 1987.

Simmons wanted the death penalty from the very beginning. A death sentence, under Arkansas law, was only permitted upon a jury's recommendation. If he had pleaded guilty, the only available sentence would have been life imprisonment without parole.

During the first trial, officers from the Franklin and Pope County sheriff's offices, the Ozark Police Department, and Troop H of the State Police at Fort Smith provided security. Several officers escorted Simmons between the Franklin County Courthouse and the Pope County Detention Center, 47 miles apart, each day. The U.S. Marshals Service provided a metal detector to check people for weapons.

Defended by two local court-appointed attorneys, John Harris and Robert "Doc" Irwin, Simmons' first trial began on Monday, May 9, 1988, in Ozark—moved there because of widespread news coverage. A seven-man, five-woman, all-white jury, with two alternates, was selected on Monday, May 9 from a jury pool of 113 people. Jury selection took about 6 hours. The jury was overwhelmingly older, working-class, and with limited formal education.

On Tuesday afternoon, Judge Patterson excused a juror following an hour-long meeting with attorneys. He had been told the juror made a derogatory remark about Simmons but declined to declare a mistrial, citing the availability of two alternates. Seventeen prosecution witnesses testified on Tuesday, including Juli Money, the Taylor Oil Company clerk, and Russellville Police Chief Herb Jonnston. Among the thirteen witnesses that testified on Wednesday were Joyce Butts, a supervisor Simmons shot at Woodline Motor Freight, and Vicky Jackson, who had been held hostage at Woodline. Nine of the thirty prosecution witnesses identified Simmons as the man involved in the rampage. One witness, Paul Epperson, a bread and pastry route salesman, said Simmons had told him he would "like to get even" with some people in the area and that there were a few people in town he would like to get even with.

In the four-day trial, Simmons was linked to shootings at four businesses through eyewitness accounts and ballistics evidence.

The defense rested without presenting evidence or calling any witnesses, even though they had subpoenaed eleven. They had previously decided against an insanity defense. "Doc" Irwin had said he planned to call about five witnesses but told the Gazette he was unable to find one. "We didn't have any witnesses," he admitted after the verdicts were reached. "We looked high and low."

Prosecutor John Bynum, arguing for death, said, "There is nothing in the record that says this man is entitled to a break—nothing."

The jury deliberated less than 1½ hours before convicting Simmons on May 12, 1988. After hearing arguments on whether to sentence him to life in prison or death, they deliberated another one hour and twenty minutes and returned with a sentence of death. Simmons was also sentenced to 30 years for each of four attempted capital murder counts, 20 years for a fifth attempted capital court, and 7 years for a first-degree false imprisonment charge, with the sentences to run consecutively, a total 147 years.

After the jurors were excused, Simmons told Circuit Judge John Patterson he had a statement to make. Speaking softly from the witness stand, Simmons stated in open court that, after careful thought and consideration, he was ready to waive all his rights to appeal.

Later that evening, one juror said, "It's something the jury was not proud of." Another said the jury had no problem with its decision.

Simmons' statement:

My statement is that if the jury renders the most proper and just and wise sentence of death in this case, I, Ronald Gene Simmons Sr., want it to be known that it is my wish and my desire that absolutely no action by anybody be taken to appeal or in any way change this sentence.

It is further respectfully requested that this sentence be carried out expeditiously. I want no action that will delay, deny, deter, or denounce this very correct and proper death sentence.

My attorneys have repeatedly counseled me to appeal. However, that is not what I want. I believe now, and always have, in the death penalty.

To those who oppose the death penalty, I say, in my particular case, anything short of death would be cruel and unusual punishment.

I am of sound mind and body and have been seen by psychoanalysts who can verify that I am capable of making a clear and rational decision. I have given clear and careful thought and consideration so there is nothing that will cause me to change my mind.

Let the torture and suffering in me end. Please allow me the right to be at peace.

After Simmons read his statement, Dr. Lew Neal, a psychiatrist, testified that Simmons was mentally competent to make the request. "There is no way he is going to change his feelings on this," Dr. Neal said. Simmons' attorneys stated that Simmons wrote the statement days earlier, against their advice.

Dr. Neal told the Arkansas Gazette that Simmons said one of his guns malfunctioned the day of the shooting and that, had it worked properly, he would have killed himself. In a statement notarized four days before the trial started, Dr. Neal said he had no reservations in concluding that the crimes Simmons was charged with were "indeed committed by Mr. Simmons in a meticulously premeditated manner." It also said Simmons would accept the death penalty because "all of his family and everyone meaningful in his life is now gone."

Later that evening, James Lee, a spokesman for the attorney general's office, said that Simmons had the right to waive his right to appeal. "Under Arkansas law, the appeal is not automatic, it is not mandatory."

==== Post-trial interview and hearings ====
Arkansas Attorney General Steve Clark and attorneys in the Simmons case all agreed on May 13 that Simmons could not be forced to appeal the murder conviction. Defense Attorney John Harris said that he had known Simmons wanted the death penalty since shortly after he first visited with him about the case. Dr. Lew Neal, a defense psychiatrist who had testified on Thursday, said in documents filed on May 13 that Simmons went to trial solely to increase the likelihood that he would be executed, and that Simmons went to trial rather than plead guilty because only a jury could impose the death penalty in Arkansas. Potentially, Simmons could have been executed before the second trial, then scheduled for July 14, on charges that he killed 14 members of his family. Under Arkansas law in 1988, an execution date could not be set earlier than 30 days after the sentence was imposed. Clark said an outside party could intervene on Simmons' behalf to halt the execution and that he fully expected it, adding that he didn't expect it to succeed. Attorney John Harris said that he and "Doc" Irwin would have to prepare to defend Simmons because of the possibility Simmons might change his mind about not appealing.

Simmons said, "Death is not to be feared," in a May 15 two-hour interview with a reporter from the Russellville Courier-Democrat. "It is what comes before death" that is to be feared. "I have no doubts that this [death sentence] is right, but I won't believe it until it happens." Refusing to answer anything about what happened at his home, he criticized the criminal justice system, saying those who need punishment don't get it. Describing himself as an introvert, he stated that he didn't answer all the questions during his examination at the State Hospital.

On May 16, Judge Patterson found Simmons to be of sound mind and could waive his right to appeal. Patterson issued an order for Simmons to be executed by lethal injection at 11 a.m. June 27. Attorney Robert E. "Doc" Irwin told the court that there were grounds for appeal and that Simmons had been advised against waiving his right to an appeal.

Calling his sentence "proper punishment for the crime," Simmons told the judge he would not try to stop the execution, stating that "I arrived at my decision in regard to the proper punishment on December 28, and don't hold your breath for me to change it." Simmons told Patterson he had decided to seek execution on the day of the shooting spree.

Judge Patterson reminded Simmons that "any time prior to execution, you have the right to change your mind and appeal." Simmons told the court that his decision was made the day of the shootings in Russellville and that he wouldn't change his mind.

==== Moved to death row ====
Simmons was moved from the Pope County Detention Center to the Arkansas Department of Correction's Maximum Security Unit in Jefferson County on May 18, 1988, where Department of Correction officers took him into custody and placed him in a cell on death row.

=== Simmons property sold at auction ===
In early January 1988, Dorothy Goeller of Woodhaven, N.Y., filed a foreclosure suit against Simmons, seeking the return of the property she had sold to Simmons on Broomfield Road and $28,081.11 in alleged unpaid balance. Simmons and his mother-in-law Mae Noval were named as defendants The foreclosure petition was approved in May after there had been no payments since November 1987. On June 15, the property was sold at an auction on the steps of the Pope County Courthouse. Three television crews and two newspaper reporters covered the auction. The only bid came from the woman from whom Simmons had bought the property. On March 29, 1989, the house, which had been subjected to ongoing vandalism, was destroyed by fire. The state fire marshal ruled the blaze arson. The site has since faded from public attention with no subsequent property development.

After the trial in Ozark, Simmons met several times with Roger and Viola O'Shields. Viola was Becky's sister. Simmons told Roger that he had intended to kill himself after he was finished with his victims. When Roger asked him why he changed his mind, Simmons told him, "Do you know what kind of ammunition I was using? .22 caliber hollow points. They don't penetrate. They splatter. I did not want to shoot myself and become a vegetable."

A Morrilton attorney, Mark Cambiano, announced on June 1 that he had been asked to appeal the Simmons case by Arkansas Churches for Life, a nonprofit organization formed in 1987 and chaired by the Catholic priest Reverend Louis J. Franz of Star City (Lincoln County), who also counseled death-row inmates in Arkansas. Simmons' attorneys, John C. Harris and Robert E. "Doc" Irwin said they would oppose any intervention efforts.

On June 6, Cambiano asked the Arkansas Supreme Court to review Simmons' death sentence for clarification on whether an appeal was mandatory. Additionally, a petition was filed in the Franklin County Circuit Court seeking to allow Reverend Louis J. Franz to intervene. A motion for a stay of execution and a notice of appeal were also filed.

On June 7, Reverend Franz, represented by Cambiano, filed briefs with the Arkansas Supreme Court seeking a mandatory appeal of death sentences, arguing that the U.S. Constitution required a review of all death sentence cases. Cambiano also filed documents asking the Court to stop the execution of Simmons, allow Franz to participate in the case to raise issues about mandatory reviews of death sentences and Simmons' competence, and order the Franklin County Circuit Court to assemble the documents needed for the Court to consider the issues.

In a letter to the Russellville Courier Democrat dated June 7, Simmons said he objected to any intervention in his case and questioned Cambiano's motives for intervening. In a second letter dated June 11, Simmons harshly criticized attempts to delay the execution by Arkansas Churches for Life and attorney Cambiano. He also claimed that "high-ranking officials within the Arkansas Department of Correction (ADC), Maximum Security Unit" deliberately tried to keep him uninformed about news coverage of their attempted intervention. He also stated that his success in avoiding an appeal would not deny other inmates the right to appeal their sentences. The letter was sent to John Robert Starr, managing editor of the Arkansas Democrat, and Laura Shull at the Russellville Courier Democrat.

In an interview with Russellville's Courier-Democrat on June 16, Simmons said he had prepared himself mentally for the possibility that he might not die on the date scheduled and that he thought the state Supreme Court or Governor Bill Clinton would grant a stay of his scheduled execution so that his conviction and sentence could be appealed to the Arkansas Supreme Court. Simmons also said other death row inmates saw him as a threat to their attempts to stay alive because he wants to die while they are trying to avoid execution. There had not been an execution in Arkansas for 24 years.

After a two-hour hearing in Ozark on June 17, Circuit Judge John S. Patterson denied the petition to delay Simmons' scheduled execution filed by Cambiano despite testimony from State Hospital psychiatrist Dr. Irving Kuo that Simmons might suffer from a mental illness. During the hearing, Simmons took the stand to oppose allowing anyone to enter his case or have his execution delayed. Judge Patterson expressed disappointment that Reverend Franz, the petitioner, was not present.

Seven days before his scheduled execution, the Arkansas Supreme Court issued a temporary stay on June 20 after attorney Mark S. Cambiano, on behalf of Reverend Franz, raised questions about whether Arkansas had or should have had a mandatory review of capital cases or the waiver of appeals in such cases. The ruling was 6 to 1 to stay the execution to give the Court time to consider the petitions by Franz.

After the state Supreme Court action, on June 21, Circuit Judge Patterson said that the trial for the murders of the Simmons family members, initially scheduled for July 18, would be postponed indefinitely pending decisions by the higher court. Patterson added that the state must try Simmons within a year of his arrest, meaning a trial would be held before December 28 if Simmons wasn't executed.

The Arkansas Supreme Court heard arguments on June 27 on whether it should review Simmons' conviction and death sentence. Also at issue was whether Simmons was competent to waive an appeal, whether someone could intervene on his behalf, and whether an appeal of a death sentence should be mandatory. Simmons' attorneys, Robert E. "Doc" Brian and John C. Harris, argued that if a defendant waives his conviction and death sentence, an appeals-court review is probably a necessary safeguard for the sentencing portion of the state's death penalty law to withstand a test before the U.S. Supreme Court. Mark Cambiano, attorney for Arkansas Churches for Life, argued, "We don't want the precedent of someone going straight from court to the death chamber without any type of review."

The temporary stay was terminated by the Arkansas Supreme Court on July 11, 1988, in a 5–2 ruling that also held that Rev. Franz did not have standing in the case and that Simmons understood his choice not to appeal. The Court said state law didn't require an appeal in death-sentencing cases and that it didn't have to require one to be constitutional. The Court established a procedure for situations in which a condemned person did not appeal, holding that the Supreme Court must review trial court determinations that the defendant made a knowing and intelligent waiver of the right to appeal. On July 25, in a one-sentence order, the Court rejected Reverend Franz's request for a rehearing. His attorney, Mark Cambiano, said he would file writs with Justice Harry Blackmun of the U.S. Supreme Court, asking the high court to decide whether Arkansas can execute a man whose conviction had not been reviewed by an appeals court.

With the stay lifted, Arkansas Governor Bill Clinton set Simmons' execution date for August 9 in a proclamation on July 15. A.L. "Art" Lockhart, director of the Arkansas Department of Corrections, was to set the execution time. Copies of the proclamation setting the execution date were sent to Lockhart and Simmons.

A "next friend" appeal seeking mandatory review of Simmons' conviction and sentence was filed in U.S. District Court on August 2 by death row inmate Darrell Wayne Hill and attorney Mark Cambiano, representing Rev. Louis J. Franz. Cambiano asked U.S. District Judge G. Thomas Eisele to issue a stay of Simmons' scheduled execution. The petition claimed there was reason to believe Simmons was mentally incompetent and unable to knowingly decide to waive his right to appeal and that Simmons had not received a fair trial because his lawyers were ineffective.

At a conference called by Judge Eisele to consider motions on August 3, 1988, Eisele stayed the execution and asked the attorneys to submit briefs on mandatory review. Setting August deadlines for brief submissions, he said he expected to decide in September whether a court review in death penalty cases is mandatory but wouldn't consider whether others had standing to intervene or whether Simmons was competent to waive his right to appeal. The judge said that Simmons could not be put to death until questions about the review of death penalty cases were resolved. Eisele noted that if the courts would not allow Gary Gilmore's mother to appeal on his behalf in 1976, it was unlikely Franz, Hill, or the church group would be allowed to appeal on Simmons' behalf.

Attorney Mark Cambiano filed a motion on August 12 asking that a temporary guardian be appointed to represent Simmons and try to determine if he was mentally competent, claiming that Simmons' attorneys, John Harris and Robert W. "Doc" Irwin, had provided ineffective assistance of counsel. The motion said that Mitchell A. Karlan, a New York lawyer, had volunteered to take the appointment.

After Circuit Judge John S. Patterson scheduled a tentative trial date for the first week of December, defense attorneys requested that Simmons be brought to Russellville to make him more accessible for preparing motions pending in state and federal courts. Simmons was moved from death row to the Russellville jail on August 19 and returned to death row at the Maximum Security Unit near Tucker on September 1.

Judge Eisele ruled on September 23 that Reverend Franz and inmate Hill lacked standing to appeal Simmons' execution and that Simmons himself must pursue any further appeals in the case. He also ruled that the Arkansas Supreme Court had held that mandatory appeals in capital cases were not required.

In a hearing on September 29, Judge Eisele ordered more psychiatric evaluations for Simmons. Eisele appointed Little Rock lawyer John Wesley Hall Jr. to advise Simmons on possible avenues of appeal and ordered a transcript of the trial for that purpose. During the hearing, Eisele asked Simmons several questions. Simmons said he knew his rights and had discussed the trial with his attorney. Before making a final ruling on the competency issue, Eisele wanted a 30-day assessment of Simmons by authorities at the Medical Center for Federal Prisoners in Springfield, Missouri. A transcript was also sent to the federal hospital for use in the evaluation. Judge Eisele later extended the evaluation period by another 15 days.

On November 3, 1988, John Wesley Hall said that his role was to meet with Simmons and his attorneys and "explore whether it is a knowing waiver of his rights." He subsequently thoroughly reviewed the case records and concluded that Simmons' attorneys had made all appropriate arguments and objections and that the issues on appeal had been addressed.

While at the Medical Center for Federal Prisoners, Simmons refused to cooperate, and the psychiatric team was unable to determine his mental competency, according to a report submitted to Judge Eisele dated November 19. They concluded that Simmons might be paranoid but offered no opinion on whether he was competent to waive his federal appeals. The team reported that Simmons not only refused to cooperate but also deliberately hindered their efforts to assess his thinking. Simmons had stated he was transferred to the federal prison hospital "under protest," and he didn't believe the transfer was justified because he had already undergone prior evaluations of his mental condition. Simmons told them he believed a psychiatrist involved in his evaluation at the Arkansas state hospital had betrayed him. Simmons' attorneys had advised him "to cooperate fully during the evaluation, but not to discuss any aspects of any charges with anyone." Attorney John Wesley Hall said he would probably have advised the same thing.

In a 19-page order, on December 29, Judge Eisle ruled, "Simmons has the capacity to appreciate his position and to make a rational choice with respect to continuing or abandoning further litigation."

=== Preliminary activities in the Simmons family murders case ===
==== Trial moved to Clarksville ====
On December 21, 1988, Judge John Patterson issued an order moving Simmons' trial for the murders of his 14 family members to Clarksville, in Johnson County, because of pre-trial publicity. Five days were set aside for the trial, set to begin on February 6, 1989, with a pretrial hearing scheduled for February 18 in Russellville. The 14 deaths had been consolidated into one count of capital murder.

==== Evidentiary hearing ====
In advance of the trial of Simmons on the murders of his family, Judge Patterson held an evidentiary hearing in Russellville on January 18 and 19, 1989 on defense motions seeking to suppress evidence and to dismiss the case for violation of a speedy trial rule and double jeopardy rules.

Attorney Robert E. "Doc" Irwin moved to suppress the evidence, arguing that authorities searched Simmons' home without a warrant and that all evidence should be suppressed. Sheriff Jim Bolen and other officers testified that they entered the home on December 27, 1987, after Simmons had been arrested in Russellville following the shootings there. They testified that they were concerned for the family's welfare. They entered under guidelines that authorize officers to act when they have reason to believe an emergency exists. Bolin said he thought Simmons' family members could be injured, perhaps bleeding to death in the house, and that this concern was based on Simmons' reaction when asked about his family. Though Simmons wouldn't answer any questions, Bolin said that, when asked if he would consent to a search of the residence, Simmons "shook his head, no, his lips was quivering, and his eyes watered up." Sheriff Bolin testified, "I felt very deeply that his family might be in there, might be shot, and needing medical help. We couldn't find them. He wouldn't tell us where they were." Bolin also said, "The first thing we did when we got in there was to check each body to see whether there was any life left in them."

Some items were excluded from evidence. Officers entered the house on December 28, 1987, because of an emergency. They returned the next morning and continued searching when the emergency conditions no longer existed. Officers obtained a search warrant at 6:10 PM.

The motion to dismiss Simmons's case for violation of the right to a speedy trial within one year was denied. Prosecuting attorney John Bynum had argued that the two months Simmons was in a state hospital undergoing psychiatric evaluations couldn't be counted against that time.

The defense team held that trying Simmons on the murders of his family would constitute double jeopardy, arguing that the crimes at the Simmons home and in Russellville were all one criminal episode and should have all been tried as one case. Patterson denied that motion, ruling that there were two criminal episodes, one near Dover where 14 people died and another in Russellville.

After Bynum said he would file an amended order that would charge Simmons with one count of capital murder for the deaths of family members, Patterson ruled that the 14 deaths would be treated as one count of capital murder.

=== Trial for family murders ===
Simmons' trial for the December 1987 deaths of 14 family members began on Monday, February 6 with jury selection from a pool of 89 potential jurors. Judge Patterson addressed the publicity issue by asking, "Is there anybody who has not heard anything about this case?" Nobody raised their hands.

Security was tight for the trial. Officers from the Pope County Sheriff's Office, the Johnson County Sheriff's Office, the Clarksville Police Department, and the Arkansas State Police were present. Officers guarded every entrance to the courthouse, and a metal detector was set up at the courtroom entrance. Simmons was transported from the Pope County Jail every day because the Johnson County jail was closed.

Jury selection was completed late Tuesday, with four women and eight men seated. The defense exhausted its peremptory challenges before the last two jurors were selected.

During opening arguments on Wednesday, February 8, in a Clarksville courtroom crowded with about 100 spectators, prosecutor John Bynum said the prosecution "knows" Simmons' motive for killing 14 family members. He said he would present notes by Simmons that authorities found in a safe deposit box at Peoples Bank in Russellville in January 1988. "It will show you and indicate to you a motive as to why Mr. Simmons killed some of these people," Bynum said, and that it would describe a love-hate relationship with his oldest daughter with whom he had fathered a child. Defense attorneys objected to the notes being entered as evidence.

More than a dozen relatives of the victims sat on two benches at the front of the courtroom.

Nine people, primarily law enforcement officers, testified for the prosecution on February 8.

Testimony on the morning of February 9 from law enforcement officers focused on the discovery of five bodies found in the Simmons home after his arrest. Evidence presented included eight photographs of the graves and car trunks, a 15-inch piece of cord from the bottom of the grave, and a videotape of the bodies being removed from the grave and from the car trunks. Relatives of the victims bowed their heads to avoid watching the tape and asked several members of the media to stand in front of them to block their view even more.

Dr. Bennett G. Preston, a former assistant medical examiner for Arkansas, summarized his findings from the autopsies of the 14 bodies. All of the adult victims had been shot, while all the minors had been strangled with some type of rope. Additional testimony indicated that no firearms were recovered at the Simmons residence and that the victims who died from gunshot wounds had been shot with a weapon taken from Simmons at the time of his arrest in Russellville on December 28, 1987.

The bodies of 20-month-old William Henry "Trae" Simmons and 22-month-old Michael McNulty were wet when brought to the medical examiner's office. Their cause of death was determined to be strangulation. Prosecutor Bynum alleged that Simmons had intended to hide the bodies in the barrels of water inside the house after he killed them but changed his mind and placed each in green garbage bags and hid them in the trunks of two abandoned cars.

As to motive in the trial, a family friend told investigators that Simmons' wife had been saving up money to divorce Simmons when the killings happened.

On the morning of February 10, a state firearms and tool marks examiner testified that bullets taken from the bodies of five of the victims matched a gun Simmons had with him when he was arrested. Bullet fragments from the sixth victim could not be positively identified.

During a routine sidebar conference just before noon between the judge and both parties, Simmons lunged between the lawyers and punched John Bynum, the prosecutor, in the chin, "sending spectators shrieking and ducking beneath their seats." After missing with a second punch and reaching for the holstered gun of one of the officers, Simmons was subdued by court officers who swarmed over him and hurried him out a side door and up to the third floor jail. Startled jurors watched, and some relatives of the slain family dove for the floor. Charlotte Crosston, whose daughter and son-in-law died in the murder spree, said, "I'm glad he showed the jury, and I'm glad the jury got to see what he's really like." Simmons' attorneys apologized to the judge and agreed to Simmons being manacled for the rest of the trial.

Bynum had introduced a letter between Simmons and his daughter Sheila in which Simmons expressed anger that Sheila had revealed that he was the father of her child and that he would see her in hell. Bynum later said he saw the punch coming right before it landed. "I was startled, but it didn't hurt me. He may have tried to hit me on the chest, but the only blow I felt was the one to the face."

Judge Patterson immediately had the startled jurors removed from the courtroom and, before declaring a recess, told them, "I want you to set aside what happened in the courtroom just now." "The trial has gone on for five days. We want to finish if we can. You need to disregard the incident that just happened here today."

When his attorney asked why he had punched the prosecutor, Simmons replied, "I am in control, I am in control." Harris thought it was intended to sabotage any defense that might be offered. Simmons sought no sympathy from the jury and aimed for a death sentence, even striking Bynum to ensure it.

Pope County Sheriff James Bolin said he thought the incident was calculated, adding, "A minute and a half after the incident, he was grinning and composed." Bolin sat directly to the left of Simmons for the rest of the proceedings.

Sometime later, in one of their confidential, off-the-record meetings, Ann Jansen spoke with Simmons about hitting the prosecutor. She asked, "Gene, what did you do?" He smirked and replied, "MNM," explaining it stood for "mitigating or mitigation neutralizing maneuver." He wanted the jury's last impression to be an act of violence to secure the death penalty.

After the recess, Lieutenant Jay Winters of the Pope County Sheriff's Department read a transcript of five pages of notes found in Simmons' safety deposit box in a Russellville bank. Prosecutor Bynum said it was a letter to Simmons' eldest daughter, Sheila McNulty. "I told you that your lack of communication with me was going to be your downfall," Simmons wrote. "You have destroyed me, and in time you will destroy yourself." "If you are trying to hurt me, then you should be very proud of yourself, because you have done a very good job of it. You have destroyed me. I do not want D. to set foot on my property. He turned you against me. You want me out of your life. I will be out of your life. I will see you in hell."

The transcription was the last piece of evidence introduced in the trial.

The trial included 18 prosecution witnesses while the defense presented none. However, before Simmons' attack on Bynum, the defense had planned to call a ballistics expert, a police dispatcher, and Vicky Jackson, the Woodline Freight employee Simmons told to call police. Defense attorney Irwin said the witnesses' testimony had been placed in the record during a meeting in Judge Patterson's chambers, away from the jury.

==== Closing arguments, conviction, and sentencing ====
In closing arguments, Prosecutor Bynum told the jury that there was no other reason for the mass murders than to avoid detection and arrest. He characterized the killings as intentional rather than impulsive. Referring to the notes presented in evidence, Bynum said, "It's obvious he hated these people from the tone of the note." He said that the evidence showed Simmons acted alone and that the killings were deliberate. He stated that victims had been shot or strangled, including members of Simmons' family.

Bynum argued that a .22-caliber revolver taken from Simmons when he was arrested had been purchased locally and that the same gun had been used to kill family members. Referring to the strangling of one grandchild with a fish stringer, he asked, "What's more cruel and vicious than that?"

Bynum also addressed the condition of the bodies found in the mass grave, stating that kerosene had been used in an effort to limit odor and avoid detection, preventing the smell from rising from the ground and attracting animals or people.

In closing arguments for the defense, attorney John Harris argued that the state had not presented direct evidence showing that Simmons had shot or strangled the victims. He said no evidence placed Simmons on the property between December 23 and 26 and questioned the adequacy of the investigation, including why investigators had not tested objects at the scene for fingerprints. Harris acknowledged that multiple victims had died but argued that the state's case lacked sufficient evidentiary support.

Handcuffed after the earlier outburst, Simmons showed no emotion when the jury found him guilty that evening at 8:30 PM after deliberating for more than four hours. The jury returned with a sentence of lethal injection at 11:08 PM. Relatives of the victims clapped when the verdict was announced, but the courtroom was silent when the sentence was read. Again, Simmons showed no emotion.

After Simmons told Judge Patterson he knew of no reason he should not be immediately sentenced, the judge set the execution for March 16.

Simmons had 30 days after the conviction to appeal.

=== After the trials ===
Following the trial and sentencing, the attorneys for Simmons "strongly hinted" that Simmons might appeal his latest death sentence, but later, attorney John Harris said that there was no predetermined agreement on whether or not to appeal. Prosecutor Bynum said, "I'm told this case might be appealed." Irwin said that the two trials were very different. At the first trial, several eyewitnesses testified about his actions and identity. In the second trial, no witnesses survived, and prosecutors relied on circumstantial evidence.

On February 22, Simmons told his attorney, John Harris, that he had no desire to appeal this case.

Simmons refused to appeal his death sentence, stating, "To those who oppose the death penalty: In my particular case, anything short of death would be cruel and unusual punishment." The trial court conducted a hearing concerning Simmons' competence to waive further proceedings and concluded that his decision was knowing and intelligent.

Attorney John Wesley Hall Jr. filed a 74-page report in U.S. District Judge G. Thomas Eisele's court on February 28, 1988, stating that there were at least three issues from Simmons' May 1987 trial that could reverse that conviction. The alleged errors included juror misconduct, an improper search of the car Simmons drove the day of the shootings in Russellville, and identification evidence withheld by the prosecution. The report also said there was an error related to the death sentence and an error in the 157-year sentence on the attempted murder and kidnapping charges.

A hearing was held in Russellville on March 1, 1989, by Judge John Patterson to consider whether Simmons was competent to waive his appeal of the February trial's death sentence. With hands cuffed to a large leather waistband, Simmons stated on the witness stand that justice "should be fair but swift," adding, "Justice delayed is justice denied." When asked by the judge whether life imprisonment would be preferable to execution, Simmons stated that imprisonment would be "an unacceptable alternative." Patterson found Simmons competent to waive an appeal of his conviction.

After the hearing, Simmons talked to reporters in a rare move. While he declined to discuss the crimes or his apparent death wish, he made threatening and disparaging statements about people who had blocked his first death sentence, namely Reverend Louis J. Franz of Star City and Morrilton attorney Mark Cambiano. "Perhaps you folks can suggest to scum Cambiano and joker Franz that as they crawl through their self-created cesspool, that maybe they ought to keep an eye over their shoulder," Simmons said. "Someone might just want to put their lights out."

At a March 9, 1989, federal hearing, U.S. District Judge G. Thomas Eisele lifted the federal stay of execution in the Russellville murders case and found that Simmons had knowingly and intelligently waived his right to appeal his death sentence. Simmons told the court that the decision whether to appeal was his own, stating, "I will not be strong-armed by any court to justify it," and indicated that he preferred execution to further delay. Before the hearing, Simmons had met with John Wesley Hall Jr. to go over the 74-page report Hall had compiled. "It is your decision to make," Eisele told Simmons, accepting Simmons' waiver of federal appeal rights.

On March 10, the Arkansas Supreme Court ruled Simmons competent to waive his appeal for his February 1989 conviction.

In a separate case, the Arkansas Supreme Court ruled on March 13 that convicted murderer Jonas H. Whitmore, another death row inmate, had no standing to intervene on Simmons' behalf. In a petition dated March 13, Whitmore, through Little Rock attorney Art Allen, asked Justice Harry Blackmun to issue a stay of execution for Simmons. Blackmun received the petition and referred it to the entire court on March 14.

On March 15, 1989, the U.S. Supreme Court stayed the execution scheduled for the next day in response to Jonas Whitmore's request. Simmons was eating what was to be his last meal, 12 hours before the scheduled execution, when he learned of the decision. Simmons showed no emotion when he learned of the stay except to ask to be allowed to finish the meal. The stay was temporary, pending the filing and disposition of a petition seeking the court's review of certain issues.

In the May 1988 death sentence case, on March 17, 1989, Gov. Bill Clinton set an execution date for April 5.

Simmons' execution set for April 5 was indefinitely stayed on March 29, 1989, by a three-member panel of the U.S. 8th Circuit Court of Appeals to review Eisele's ruling in the first trial and allow the U.S. Supreme Court to weigh Whitmore's petition on the family slayings, subject to the second trial. The 8th Circuit blocked the execution for the Russellville slayings for two reasons, first, to give the U.S. Supreme Court time to consider the issues raised in the case involving the family slayings, and second, to give the 8th Circuit time to review U.S. District Judge G. Thomas Eisele's rejection of an appeal of Simmons' conviction in the Russellville murders.

Also on March 29, just hours after the stay of execution by the 8th Circuit Court of Appeals, the former home of the Simmons family, the scene of ongoing vandalism, was destroyed by fire. Authorities determined later that day that the fire was caused by arson, a finding confirmed by State Fire Marshal Dwayne Luter.

On July 3, the U.S. Supreme Court agreed to review Whitmore's appeal on whether the U.S. Constitution requires state appellate review of all death sentences.

The U.S. Supreme Court on November 27 set a January 1990 date for oral argument in the Simmons case and denied a request to consolidate Simmons' two capital murder convictions into one case.

On January 10, 1990, a seemingly skeptical Supreme Court of the United States heard oral arguments from an Arkansas death row inmate seeking to prevent the execution of Ronald Gene Simmons. During arguments in Whitmore v. Arkansas, justices questioned whether third parties had standing to intervene in a capital case and whether the Constitution required mandatory appellate review of death sentences. Steve Clark argued that Arkansas law permitted defendants to waive appeals, while counsel for the petitioner contended that the state's system was unconstitutional because it allowed executions without full appellate review. Several justices expressed concern about expanding standing to unrelated parties and about the implications such a ruling would have for other cases nationwide. If they were to rule that Whitmore didn't have standing, the Arkansas capital punishment law would not be considered.

On April 24, 1990, the U.S. Supreme Court ruled in Whitmore v. Arkansas in a 7-2 decision that Whitmore lacked standing to intervene, leaving the mandatory appellate review of a death sentence in Arkansas unaddressed. The net effect of the ruling was that the only person that could stop the execution was Simmons.

Arkansas Attorney General Steve Clark asked the 8th U.S. Circuit Court of Appeals on April 25 to remove a stay of execution that it had granted to Simmons.

On May 31, Governor Bill Clinton signed a new death warrant for Simmons for June 25, 1990, nearly two years after the original date.

With the execution of John Edward Swindler on June 18, 1990, Simmons' scheduled execution one week later would be the second execution in Arkansas in 26 years. Also on June 18, the Correction Department started the process for Simmons' execution when local authorities were notified Simmons would be transferred to the Cummins Unit, the location of the Arkansas death chamber.

== Execution ==
On June 19, 1990, the electric chair at the Cummins Unit was replaced with a gurney for lethal injection, the method Ronald Gene Simmons had chosen for his execution. On June 22, Simmons was transferred from the Maximum Security Unit to a holding cell beside the death chamber at Cummins.

For his final meal, Simmons requested an 8-ounce, well-done filet mignon, raw onions and tomatoes, buttered rolls, cheese, a banana, and two cans of Seven-Up. In the days before his execution, he refused visitors and communication with prison officials or others. Authorities reported no indication that he intended to halt the execution by pursuing further appeals, though he retained the right to do so until the lethal injection began.

Before the execution on June 25, Simmons gave a brief final statement: "I want to say just a few words, justice delayed finally be done is justifiable homicide." Witnesses included reporters Bob Simmons of the Associated Press and Scott Bowles of the Arkansas Gazette.

At 9:00 PM, the curtains to the execution chamber opened. Simmons was strapped to a gurney under fluorescent lights and intravenous lines were placed both arms. At 9:02 PM, Warden Willis Seargent announced that the execution would begin. Simmons blinked frequently and briefly looked toward the witnesses. At 9:06 PM, he cried out, "Oh, oh," coughed, and began convulsing. Over the next several minutes, the convulsions gradually subsided. By 9:10 PM, he was motionless. After examination by prison medical staff and the Lincoln County coroner, Simmons was pronounced dead at 9:19 PM

Simmons' execution was historically significant in Arkansas as the state's first execution by lethal injection, the first in which an inmate waived his appeals, and only the second execution carried out after the resumption of capital punishment following a 26-year moratorium.

== Afterward ==
Simmons was buried in a pauper's plot in Varner, Arkansas following a 10-minute graveside service on June 27, 1990.

In mid-August 1990, three videotapes from the Simmons property murder scenes were burned after Judge Patterson authorized their destruction. Sheriff Bolin said he had wanted to destroy the tapes since Simmons' execution and had received numerous requests for copies from around the country, both before and after the execution. The tapes documented 14 bodies: four adults and one child in the house, seven in a shallow grave, and two children wrapped in trash bags in the trunks of abandoned cars. Portions of the videos were shown to juries during Simmons' trials.

Simmons' two pistols sold at auction for $2,925. A Pottsville resident paid $1,325 for a gun not used in the murders as a souvenir. The second pistol, used to kill eight people, was purchased by Simmons' attorney John C. Harris, who said the bids were "too low." Although more than 100 people, including about a dozen journalists, attended the auction, only 13 people bid on either gun, with nearly all bidding done by four men.

== See also ==
- Capital punishment in Arkansas
- Capital punishment in the United States
- List of people executed in Arkansas
- List of people executed in the United States in 1990
- Volunteer (capital punishment)

== Bibliography ==
- Moore, Jim: Rampage - America's Largest Family Mass Murder; The Summit Publishing Group, 1992. ISBN 978-1-56530-002-6
- Marshall, Bryce Zero at the Bone: Story of Gene Simmons Mass Murder; Pocket Star Books, 1991. ISBN 978-0-671-68511-9

Executions carried out in Arkansas
Preceded by John Edward Swindler June 18, 1990	Ronald Gene Simmons; June 25, 1990	Succeeded by Ricky Ray Rector January 24, 1992
Executions carried out in the United States
Preceded by John Edward Swindler – Arkansas June 18, 1990	Ronald Gene Simmons – Arkansas; June 25, 1990	Succeeded by James Edward Smith – Texas June 26, 1990
