= Simonds =

Simonds may refer to:

== People ==
- D'Marcus Simonds (born 1997), American basketball player
- Francis May Simonds (1894–1961), American World War I flying ace
- Gavin Simonds, 1st Viscount Simonds (1881–1971), British judge
- George Blackall Simonds (1843–1929), English sculptor
- Major General George S. Simonds (1874–1938), U.S. Army officer
- Lieutenant General Guy Simonds (1903–1974), Canadian Army officer
- John O. Simonds (1913–2005), American landscape architect
- Justin Simonds (1890–1967), Australian clergyman
- Katherine Call Simonds (1865–?), American musician, singer, author, composer, social reformer
- Kenneth Simonds (1935–2009), American businessman
- Maria Simonds-Gooding (born 1939), Indian born Anglo-Irish artist
- Merilyn Simonds (born 1949), Canadian author
- Nathaniel Simonds (1775–1850), American politician
- Ossian Cole Simonds (1855–1931), American landscape designer
- Robert Simonds (born 1964), American film producer
- William Simonds (author) (1822–1859), American author
- William Blackall Simonds (1761–1834), English brewer and banker
- William E. Simonds (1842–1903), American politician

== Fictional characters ==
- Matthew Simonds, Honorverse character

== Organisations ==
- H & G Simonds Ltd, a former brewing company from Reading, England
- Simonds Catholic College, Melbourne, Australia
- Simonds Elementary School, Langley, British Columbia, Canada
- Simonds Farsons Cisk, a food and beverage conglomerate in Malta
- Simonds' Regiment of Militia, Berkshire County, Massachusetts, United States

== Places ==
- Simonds Parish, Carleton County, New Brunswick, Canada
- Simonds Parish, Saint John County, New Brunswick, Canada
