= List of people executed in Arkansas (pre-1972) =

The following is a list of people executed in the U.S. state of Arkansas before 1972, when capital punishment was briefly abolished by the Supreme Court's ruling in Furman v. Georgia. For people executed after the restoration of capital punishment by the Supreme Court's ruling in Gregg v. Georgia (1976), see List of people executed in Arkansas.

== Hanging ==
Slave executions

=== 1836–1849 ===
Name	Race	Age	Date of execution	County	Crime	Victim(s)	Governor
William McKee	White		May 26, 1837	Pulaski	Murder	Buford P. Scott, white	James Sevier Conway
William Brown	White		October 19, 1838	Pope	Murder	Mary M. Brown, white (wife)	James Sevier Conway
Tyre O'Neal	White		1840	Pike	Horse stealing	N/A	Conway or Yell
Quinn	White		1841	Lafayette	Murder	Male, white	Archibald Yell
Frank	Black		December 22, 1843	Crawford	Rape	Susan Rose, white	Archibald Yell
Dennis	Black		December 22, 1843	Crawford	Rape	Susan Rose, white	Archibald Yell
Henry Scaggs	White		October 25, 1844	Hempstead	Murder	William B. Oaks, white	Samuel Adams
Kloo-Ni-Wo-Hi-Ty	Native American		January 1845	Washington	Murder-Robbery	James P. Bigelow, white	Thomas Stevenson Drew
Tau-No-Hi-Yunhi	Native American		January 1845	Washington	Murder-Robbery	James P. Bigelow, white	Thomas Stevenson Drew
Ka-No-Ske-Ski	Native American		January 1845	Washington	Murder-Robbery	James P. Bigelow, white	Thomas Stevenson Drew
Crawford Burnett	White		November 8, 1845	Washington	Murder-Robbery	Jonathan Selby, white	Thomas Stevenson Drew
Lavinia Burnett (Note: First woman executed by the state of Arkansas.)	White	60	November 8, 1845	Washington	Murder-Robbery	Jonathan Selby, white	Thomas Stevenson Drew
John Burnett	White		December 26, 1845	Washington	Murder-Robbery	Jonathan Selby, white	Thomas Stevenson Drew
Bob	Black		1847	Union	Attempted rape		Thomas Stevenson Drew
John Dowdy	White		April 25, 1847	Ouachita	Murder	Male, Native American	Thomas Stevenson Drew
Henry	Black		1849	Union	Murder-Rape	Mrs. Abbot, white	Drew, Byrd, or Roane
Sam	Black		1849	Union	Murder-Rape	Mrs. Abbot, white	Drew, Byrd, or Roane

=== 1850s ===
Name	Race	Age	Date of execution	County	Crime	Victim(s)	Governor
Proctor			?	Crawford	Murder		?
Skilley			?	Crawford	Murder		?
Manual	Black		May 1851		Murder	Male, white (owner)	John Selden Roane
Unknown	Black		1853	Ashley	Murder	Mr. Davis, white (owner)	Elias Nelson Conway
Unknown (Note: Second woman executed by the state of Arkansas and the last to be hanged.)	Black		1853	Ashley	Murder	Mr. Davis, white (owner)	Elias Nelson Conway
Doghead Glory	Native American		February 4, 1853	Benton	Murder	David Scootie, Native American	Elias Nelson Conway
Buck White	Native American		1854	Franklin	Murder	Unknown	Elias Nelson Conway
Austin	Black		June 9, 1854	Lawrence (Note: Change of venue from Independence County.)	Murder	Benjamin Watson, white (owner)	Elias Nelson Conway
Randall	Black	26	August 1, 1856	Washington	Murder	Dr. James Boone, white	Elias Nelson Conway
Willis Beard	White		May 29, 1857	Crawford (Federal)	Murder	John Kelley, white	Elias Nelson Conway
John Bass	White		April 1858		Murder-Robbery	Male, white (tax collector) (Note: Serial killer. Confessed at his execution to robbing and murdering three other white men as well as murdering a black man in Tuscaloosa County, Alabama and escaping punishment for the crime by receiving a change of venue to Pickens County, only to fatally whip another black man after which he fled to Arkansas.)	Elias Nelson Conway
Lafayette Sullivan	White		April 30, 1858	Independence	Murder	Thomas P. Sullivan, white (cousin)	Elias Nelson Conway
David Lewis	White	24	April 29, 1859	Independence (Note: Change of venue from White County.)	Murder	Will C. Bewler, white (father-in-law)	Elias Nelson Conway
Charles Cosgrove	White		June 10, 1859	Pulaski	Murder	G. R. Lester, white	Elias Nelson Conway

=== 1860s ===
Executions by firing squad

Name	Race	Age	Date of execution	County	Crime	Victim(s)	Governor
Fletcher	White		May 1860	Randolph	Inciting riots (Note: The men had attempted to incite a slave revolt.)	N/A	Elias Nelson Conway
Percifield	White		May 1860	Randolph	Inciting riots	N/A	Elias Nelson Conway
Robert Davis	White		January 18, 1861	Crawford	Murder	Elisha and John Clary, white	Henry Massey Rector
Alfred	Black		March 8, 1861	Washington	Murder	William Stephens, white (owner)	Henry Massey Rector
George Coker	White		April 5, 1861	Bradley	Murder		Henry Massey Rector
Henry Coker	White		April 5, 1861	Bradley	Murder		Henry Massey Rector
David Dodd	White	17	January 8, 1864	Pulaski (Military)	Espionage	N/A	Harris Flanagin
Jeremiah Earnest	White	44	March 18, 1864	Pulaski (Military)	Murder	Three people, white (Note: Elijah Osburn, his son Jesse Osburn, and Jackson Childers.)	Harris Flanagin
Thomas Miller	White		March 18, 1864	Pulaski (Military)	Murder	Three people, white	Harris Flanagin
A. J. Copeland	White		July 29, 1864	Sebastian (Military)	Murder	John Brown, white	Isaac Murphy
John Norwood	White		July 29, 1864	Sebastian (Military)	Murder	John Brown, white	Isaac Murphy
William Cary	White		July 29, 1864	Sebastian (Military)	Murder	John Brown, white	Isaac Murphy
James Rowden	White		July 29, 1864	Sebastian (Military)	Murder	John Brown, white	Isaac Murphy
Alexander McBroom	White	34	April 21, 1865	Sebastian (Military)	Desertion	N/A	Isaac Murphy
Franklin Patterson	White	34	May 5, 1865	Sebastian (Military)	Murder	Frank Marzall, 48, white	Isaac Murphy
McAdams	Black		1868	Union	Murder	General Moore, black	Murphy or Clayton
Tobe Owens	Black		September 4, 1868	Little River	Murder	Male, minor, black	Powell Clayton
Wiliam Reece	Black		January 19, 1869	Crittenden (Military)	Rape	Three females, white	Powell Clayton
Unknown	Black		January 19, 1869	Crittenden (Military)	Rape	Three females, white	Powell Clayton
Unknown	Black		January 19, 1869	Crittenden (Military)	Rape	Three females, white	Powell Clayton
Major Tatum	Black	21	March 25, 1869	Little River	Murder	Rev. Mr. Morrill, white	Powell Clayton
James Warner	Black		August 19, 1869	Pulaski	Murder-Robbery	Mrs. Strange, white	Powell Clayton
Dave Ross	White		September 3, 1869	Crawford	Murder	John Lytle, white	Powell Clayton

=== 1870s ===
Federal executions at Fort Smith Jail

Name	Race	Age	Date of execution	County	Crime	Victim(s)	Governor
Amos McCurtain	Native American		June 24, 1870	Crawford (Federal)	Murder-Robbery	James McClain and James Blakely, Native American and black	Powell Clayton
Jerdon Grundy	Black		February 3, 1871	Crawford	Murder	Robert Monroe, black	Powell Clayton
William Harrison	Black		June 10, 1871	Crittenden	Murder	John B. Crockett, white	Ozra Amander Hadley
John Rosebrough	Black		June 10, 1871	Crittenden	Murder	William Freeman, elderly, white	Ozra Amander Hadley
Frank Cobb	Black		October 20, 1872	Ashley	Murder	Dr. W. L. McKoin, white	Ozra Amander Hadley
Ned Nighton	Black		1873	Union	Murder	Patsy Matthews, black	Hadley or Baxter
Jake Young	Black		January 31, 1873	Crawford	Rape		Elisha Baxter
William Watkins	White	41	April 25, 1873	White	Murder	William Swaggerty, white (Note: Serial killer, previously murdered three men in Georgia.)	Elisha Baxter
Brown Brewer	Black	25	May 2, 1873	White	Murder	Charles Bayley, black	Elisha Baxter
Joe Hodges	Black	28	June 27, 1873	Phillips	Murder-Robbery	Mr. Cummings, white	Elisha Baxter
James Runnels	Black	24	June 27, 1873	Phillips	Murder-Robbery	Mr. Cummings, white	Elisha Baxter
John Childers	Native American	27	August 15, 1873	N/A	Murder-Robbery	Reyburn Wedding, white	Elisha Baxter
Young Wolf	Native American		October 10, 1873	N/A	Murder-Robbery	Two trappers, white	Elisha Baxter
Tunagee	Native American		October 10, 1873	N/A	Murder-Robbery	Two trappers, white	Elisha Baxter
John Billy	Native American	18	April 3, 1874	N/A	Murder	Perry Duval, white (deputy marshal)	Elisha Baxter
John Pointer	Native American	18	April 3, 1874	N/A	Murder	Male, white	Elisha Baxter
Isaac Filmore	Native American	17	April 3, 1874	N/A	Murder-Robbery	Male, white	Elisha Baxter
Sidney Wallace	White	23	April 13, 1874	Johnson	Murder	R. W. Ward and Elisha Mears, white (constable and judge) (Note: Serial killer, committed three other murders.)	Elisha Baxter
McClish Impson	Native American		January 15, 1875	N/A	Murder	Unidentified male, white	Augustus Hill Garland
Daniel Evans	White	21	September 3, 1875	N/A	Murder-Robbery	J. R. Seaboet, white	Augustus Hill Garland
William Whittington	White	30	September 3, 1875	N/A	Murder-Robbery	John Turner, white	Augustus Hill Garland
James Moore	White	27	September 3, 1875	N/A	Murder	William Spivey, white (police officer) (Note: Serial killer, claimed Spivey was his eighth white victim and has also murdered an unknown number of black and Native American victims.)	Augustus Hill Garland
Samuel Fooy	Mixed (Note: "quarter-blood Cherokee".)	26	September 3, 1875	N/A	Murder-Robbery	John E. Naff, white	Augustus Hill Garland
Smoker Mankiller	Native American	18	September 3, 1875	N/A	Murder	William Short, white	Augustus Hill Garland
Edward Campbell	Black	20	September 3, 1875	N/A	Murder	Lawson Ross and Maria McKinney, black	Augustus Hill Garland
William B. Thompson	White		December 18, 1875	Conway	Murder	Rebecca Stover, white	Augustus Hill Garland
Cornelius Hammond	White	22	January 14, 1876	Benton	Murder	Columbus Hancock, white	Augustus Hill Garland
Gibson Ishtonubbee	Native American		April 21, 1876	N/A	Murder-Robbery	Dr. Funny and Ms. Mason, Native American and black	Augustus Hill Garland
Isham Seely	Native American	26	April 21, 1876	N/A	Murder-Robbery	Dr. Funny and Ms. Mason, Native American and black	Augustus Hill Garland
William Leech	White	36	April 21, 1876	N/A	Murder-Robbery	Henry Watkins, white	Augustus Hill Garland
Orpheus McGee	Native American		April 21, 1876	N/A	Murder	Robert Alexander, white	Augustus Hill Garland
Aaron Wilson	Black	20	April 21, 1876	N/A	Murder-Robbery	James and Frank Harris, 12 (Frank), white	Augustus Hill Garland
Tate Jackson	Black		June 1876	Monroe	Murder		Augustus Hill Garland
Samuel Peters	Native American	29	September 8, 1876	N/A	Murder	Mrs. James Hanson, white	Augustus Hill Garland
Osey Sanders	Native American	30	September 8, 1876	N/A	Murder-Robbery	Thomas S. Carlyle, white	Augustus Hill Garland
John Valley	Native American	29	September 8, 1876	N/A	Murder-Robbery	Eli Hackett, white	Augustus Hill Garland
Sinker Wilson	Native American	24	September 8, 1876	N/A	Murder	Datus Cowan, minor, white	Augustus Hill Garland
Albert Trammell	Black	35	July 28, 1877	Nevada	Murder	Nancy Trammell, black (wife)	William Read Miller
Giles Dickson	Black	42	September 7, 1877	Monroe	Murder	Nathaniel McCall, white	William Read Miller
Tom Staner	White	25	November 2, 1877	Saline	Murder	Harriet Staner (aunt) and Parcell Taylor, white	William Read Miller
John Jones	Black		December 14, 1877	Lee	Murder	Joseph Colwell, white	William Read Miller
William Baldwin	Black		May 3, 1878	Miller	Murder	Malissa Phillips, black (girlfriend)	William Read Miller
Jacob Levels	Black		June 21, 1878	Pulaski	Murder	Robert Swan, black	William Read Miller
Clint Anderson	Black		August 30, 1878	Pulaski (Note: Change of venue from Lonoke County.)	Rape	Sarah McGinty, white (Note: Anderson's guilt was strongly questioned as the woman was "of the most ignorant of the poorer class of whites" and it was suspected she had consented to Anderson's advances and only afterwards "gave him away" as Anderson himself claimed.)	William Read Miller
Charles Carr	White		November 8, 1878	Cross	Rape	Sallie Derushe, white	William Read Miller
James Diggs	Black		December 20, 1878	N/A	Murder-Robbery	J. C. Gould, white	William Read Miller
John Postoak	Native American		December 20, 1878	N/A	Murder	John Ingley, white	William Read Miller
Henry Taylor	Black		June 27, 1879	St. Francis	Rape	Martha Anthony, 7, black	William Read Miller
Henri Stewart	White	30	August 29, 1879	N/A	Murder-Robbery	J. B. Jones, white	William Read Miller
William Wiley	White	32	August 29, 1879	N/A	Murder	David J. Brown, white	William Read Miller
Robert Lancaster	White	28	September 12, 1879	Independence (Note: Change of venue from Stone County.)	Murder	Thomas Johnson, white	William Read Miller
Marcus Whitley	White		September 26, 1879	Randolph	Murder	Duke Sumner, white	William Read Miller
Joseph Kemp	White	25	October 3, 1879	Sharp	Murder	Marion D. Hulsey, white	William Read Miller

=== 1880s ===
Name	Race	Age	Date of execution	County	Crime	Victim(s)	Governor
James Howard	White	30	February 27, 1880	Franklin	Murder	Mary Smith, 20, white (girlfriend)	William Read Miller
Sidney McFadden	Black		March 12, 1880	Hempstead	Murder	Female, black (wife)	William Read Miller
L. L. Ford	White	25	May 28, 1880	Crittenden	Murder-Robbery	John Broadway, 55, white	William Read Miller
Thomas Edmunds	White	35	May 28, 1880	Franklin	Murder	Julia Ashbrook and her daughter, 17 and <1, white (common-law wife and their child)	William Read Miller
William Binns	Black		June 11, 1880	Bradley (Note: Change of venue from Drew County.)	Murder	Tom P. Edwards, black	William Read Miller
George Sanford	Black		July 9, 1880	Mississippi	Murder	Armstead Penn, white	William Read Miller
Richard McKee	Black		July 9, 1880	Mississippi	Murder	Armstead Penn, white	William Read Miller
Cal Huey	White		January 13, 1881	Mississippi (Note: Change of venue from Crittenden County.)	Murder	John Broadway, 55, white	William Read Miller
Rush Bennett	Mixed (Note: Mulatto.)	31	February 4, 1881	Union	Murder	Col. A. C. Jamison, white	Thomas James Churchill
Green Jackson	Black		February 11, 1881	Crittenden	Murder	Mr. Jones, black	Thomas James Churchill
Henry Dennison	Black		April 15, 1881	Prairie	Murder	Female, black (wife)	Thomas James Churchill
Hayes White	Black		June 10, 1881	Crittenden	Murder	W. F. Beattie, white (sheriff)	Thomas James Churchill
Isaac Green	Black	27	July 15, 1881	Lee (Note: John Hardin received a change of venue from Phillips County.)	Murder	John Richards, white	Thomas James Churchill
John Hardin	Black	20	July 15, 1881	Lee	Murder	William Brown, white	Thomas James Churchill
Willis Reeves	Black	20	July 15, 1881	Crawford	Murder	John Drake, minor, black	Thomas James Churchill
George Green	Black		July 22, 1881	Sebastian	Murder	Female, black (wife)	Thomas James Churchill
William Brown	White	28	September 9, 1881	N/A	Murder	Robert Tate, white	Thomas James Churchill
Abner Manley	Native American	19	September 9, 1881	N/A	Murder	Ellis McVay, white	Thomas James Churchill
Amos Manley	Native American	21	September 9, 1881	N/A	Murder	Ellis McVay, white	Thomas James Churchill
Patrick McGowan	White	35	September 9, 1881	N/A	Murder	Jim Latta, white	Thomas James Churchill
George Padgett	White	24	September 9, 1881	N/A	Murder	William H. Stephens, white	Thomas James Churchill
Boge Jackson	Black		November 18, 1881	Ashley	Murder	Reuben Jordan, elderly, black	Thomas James Churchill
Frank Hall	Black	40	December 9, 1881	Pulaski	Murder	Paul Saunders, black (Note: Possible serial killer, also suspected in the unsolved murder of a carpenter near Lonoke in 1876.)	Thomas James Churchill
Howard Edmunds	White	26	December 9, 1881	Bradley	Murder	Sallie Watson, 16, white (sister-in-law)	Thomas James Churchill
Whit Brown	Black	30	February 24, 1882	Jefferson	Murder-Robbery	Robert Youley, 25, white	Thomas James Churchill
Luther Taylor	White	25	April 21, 1882	Clay	Murder	Riley Black, white (Note: Possible serial killer, reportedly committed several murders in Missouri during "Reconstruction-era violence".)	Thomas James Churchill
Edward Fulsom	Native American	21	June 30, 1882	N/A	Murder	William Massingill and John Stewart, white	Thomas James Churchill
Abraham Sublett	Black		December 1, 1882	Cross	Murder	Female, black (wife)	Thomas James Churchill
Ed Garrett	Black		January 26, 1883	Miller	Murder	Female, black (wife)	James Henderson Berry
Nick Walker	Black	24	March 23, 1883	Pulaski	Murder	Tom Jenkins, black	James Henderson Berry
Robert Massey	White		April 13, 1883	N/A	Murder-Robbery	Edmond Clark, white	James Henderson Berry
Governor Nelson	Black		May 4, 1883	Lafayette	Murder	Major Ashley, black	James Henderson Berry
Jerry Blalock	White	24	May 11, 1883	Jackson	Murder	Thomas Brandenberg, white (Note: Serial killer; confessed to murdering Charles Tiny in Craighead County in 1878, an evidently undiscovered crime, before his execution.)	James Henderson Berry
Jack Hinton	White		May 25, 1883	Phillips	Murder		James Henderson Berry
Jack Taylor	White		May 25, 1883	Monroe	Murder	Col. Hugh W. Ingram, 63, white	James Henderson Berry
Joseph Young	Black	17	May 25, 1883	Little River	Rape	Mrs. Chism, white	James Henderson Berry
James Henderson	White	28	June 22, 1883	Johnson	Murder-Robbery	John Cain, white	James Henderson Berry
Gove Johnson	White	36	June 22, 1883	Johnson	Murder-Robbery	John Cain, white	James Henderson Berry
James Johnson	White	18	June 22, 1883	Johnson	Murder-Robbery	John Cain, white	James Henderson Berry
Monroe McDonald	White	33	June 22, 1883	Johnson	Murder-Robbery	John Cain, white	James Henderson Berry
William Finch	Mixed (Note: Mulatto.)	28	June 29, 1883	N/A	Murder	Bush Johnson and Jerry McCarthy, black	James Henderson Berry
Martin Joseph	Black		June 29, 1883	N/A	Murder-Rape	Bud and Lone Stephens, 16 (Lone), white (Note: Serial killer, later murdered Henry Loftus (black) out of suspicion he would reveal this previous crime.)	James Henderson Berry
Te-o-lit-se	Native American	25	June 29, 1883	N/A	Murder-Robbery	Emanuel M. Cochran, white	James Henderson Berry
Deno Casat	White	25	August 17, 1883	Pulaski	Murder	George F. Barnes, white	James Henderson Berry
William Johnson	Black		October 12, 1883	Drew	Murder	Calvin Williams, black	James Henderson Berry
James Underwood	White	30	December 7, 1883	Yell	Murder	Robert J. Pendergrass, white	James Henderson Berry
Henry Rose	Black	21	April 4, 1884	Mississippi	Murder	Dempsey Taylor, 53, mixed (Note: Mulatto.)	James Henderson Berry
Charles Wright	Black		April 25, 1884	Howard	Murder	Thomas Wyatt, white	James Henderson Berry
James Tucker	Black		May 30, 1884	Logan	Murder	Aaron Parker, white	James Henderson Berry
Dock Walker	Black	34	June 27, 1884	Miller	Murder	Lucius Grant, black	James Henderson Berry
Jack Womankiller	Native American	25	July 11, 1884	N/A	Murder-Robbery	Nathaniel Wyatt, 73, white	James Henderson Berry
Thomas Thompson	White	26	July 11, 1884	N/A	Murder-Robbery	James O'Holleran, elderly, white	James Henderson Berry
John Davis	Native American	19	July 11, 1884	N/A	Murder-Robbery	William Bullock, white	James Henderson Berry
Frank Williams	Mixed (Note: Mulatto.)	35	August 1, 1884	Jefferson	Murder	Female, black (wife)	James Henderson Berry
Jonas Bogard	Black	25	August 27, 1884	Lonoke	Rape	Ms. Ray, 11, white	James Henderson Berry
Frank Casey	Black	22	November 26, 1884	Pulaski	Murder	Charles Watson, 22, white	James Henderson Berry
Abe Frazier	Black	34	November 28, 1884	Bradley	Murder	Lewis Davis, black	James Henderson Berry
Fayette Melton	White	23	January 30, 1885	Clay	Murder	Franklin Hale, white	Simon Pollard Hughes Jr.
Rush Johnson	Black	30	February 12, 1885	Pulaski	Murder	John C. Wall, white (overseer)	Simon Pollard Hughes Jr.
Lige Parker	Black	35	February 12, 1885	Pulaski	Murder-Robbery	Lewis C. Fox, white	Simon Pollard Hughes Jr.
William Phillips	White		April 17, 1885	N/A	Murder	William Hill, white (father-in-law)	Simon Pollard Hughes Jr.
Columbus Moffett	White	20	April 24, 1885	Polk	Murder-Robbery	William Weehunt, white	Simon Pollard Hughes Jr.
Oliver Rogers	Black		May 8, 1885	Columbia	Murder	Garland Frozer, black	Simon Pollard Hughes Jr.
Goodwin Jackson	Black	40	May 22, 1885	Monroe	Murder	Sanderson Redmon, 64, black	Simon Pollard Hughes Jr.
James Arcene	Native American	22 (Note: Executed for a crime committed at age 10, making him the youngest person executed in the United States at age of offense.)	June 26, 1885	N/A	Murder-Robbery	Henry Feigel, white	Simon Pollard Hughes Jr.
William Parchmeal	Native American		June 26, 1885	N/A	Murder-Robbery	Henry Feigel, white	Simon Pollard Hughes Jr.
Rufus Dortch	Black		June 26, 1885	Lee	Murder	Male, black	Simon Pollard Hughes Jr.
David Ackles	Black		July 17, 1885	Phillips	Murder	Frank Burrell and Scilla Flanagan, 27 (Burrell), black	Simon Pollard Hughes Jr.
Henry Burnett	Mixed (Note: Mulatto.)	18	August 26, 1885	Lonoke	Murder	Nelson Anderson, 34, black	Simon Pollard Hughes Jr.
Chris Pegues	Black		October 9, 1885	Woodruff	Murder	Mollie Banks, black (girlfriend)	Simon Pollard Hughes Jr.
William Harper	White		October 30, 1885	Greene	Murder	John Sellers, white	Simon Pollard Hughes Jr.
Joseph Jackson	Black		April 23, 1886	N/A	Murder	Mary Jackson, black (wife)	Simon Pollard Hughes Jr.
James Wasson	White		April 23, 1886	N/A	Murder	Almarine Watkins, white (Note: Serial killer, also murdered Henry Martin.)	Simon Pollard Hughes Jr.
George Carroll	White	25	April 30, 1886	White	Murder	Lizzie Carroll, white (wife)	Simon Pollard Hughes Jr.
J. M. Armstrong	White		April 30, 1886	Perry	Murder	Dr. Thomas Ferguson, white	Simon Pollard Hughes Jr.
Lee Barnes	White	24	May 21, 1886	Pope	Murder-Robbery	Charles Hollman, white	Simon Pollard Hughes Jr.
Calvin James	Black		July 23, 1886	N/A	Murder	Tony Love, black	Simon Pollard Hughes Jr.
Lincoln Sprole	White		July 23, 1886	N/A	Murder	Benjamin F. and Alexander Clark, white	Simon Pollard Hughes Jr.
Kit Ross	Mixed (Note: "Halfbreed ... Ross was a part Cherokee, but looked more like a white man than an Indian.")	25	August 6, 1886	N/A	Murder	Johnathan Davis, white	Simon Pollard Hughes Jr.
John T. Echols	White	35	January 14, 1887	N/A	Murder	John Pattenridge, white	Simon Pollard Hughes Jr.
John Stephens	White	28	January 14, 1887	N/A	Murder	Three people, white (Note: Annie Kerr, her 16-year-old son, and Dr. James Pyle.)	Simon Pollard Hughes Jr.
James Lamb	White	23	January 14, 1887	N/A	Murder	George Brassfield and Edward Pollard, white	Simon Pollard Hughes Jr.
Albert O'Dell	White	26	January 14, 1887	N/A	Murder	George Brassfield and Edward Pollard, white	Simon Pollard Hughes Jr.
Abe Chambers	Black		January 21, 1887	Jackson	Murder	Jonas Williams, 18, black	Simon Pollard Hughes Jr.
Amos Johnson	Black	40	March 25, 1887	Crittenden	Rape	Margaret Arnold, 8, white (adoptive daughter)	Simon Pollard Hughes Jr.
Patrick McCarty	White		April 8, 1887	N/A	Murder-Robbery	Thomas Mahoney and his brother, white	Simon Pollard Hughes Jr.
Silas Hampton	Native American	18	October 7, 1887	N/A	Murder-Robbery	Abner Lloyd, white	Simon Pollard Hughes Jr.
Seaborn Kalijah	Native American		October 7, 1887	N/A	Murder	Three people, white (Note: Mark Kuykendall, Henry Smith, and William Kelly (sheriff's posse).)	Simon Pollard Hughes Jr.
Joe Simmons	Black		October 21, 1887	Woodruff	Murder-Robbery	R. T. Byrd, white	Simon Pollard Hughes Jr.
Albert Peters	White	27	December 30, 1887	Lee	Murder	William Johnson, 29, white	Simon Pollard Hughes Jr.
Jackson Crow	Native American		April 27, 1888	N/A	Murder	Charles Wilson, white	Simon Pollard Hughes Jr.
George Moss	Black		April 27, 1888	N/A	Murder-Robbery	George Taft, white	Simon Pollard Hughes Jr.
Owen Hill	Black		April 27, 1888	N/A	Murder	Two females, black (wife and mother-in-law)	Simon Pollard Hughes Jr.
Gus Bogles	Black		July 6, 1888	N/A	Murder	J. D. Morgan, white	Simon Pollard Hughes Jr.
Hugh Blackmon	Black		October 26, 1888	Cleveland	Murder	"Big Side", black (Note: Real name unknown.)	Simon Pollard Hughes Jr.
Richard Smith	Native American	32	January 25, 1889	N/A	Murder	Thomas Pringle, white	James Philip Eagle
Willis Green	Black		March 15, 1889	Clark	Murder	Otto Horton, black	James Philip Eagle
Anderson Mitchell	Black		March 15, 1889	Clark	Murder	Otto Horton, black	James Philip Eagle
Daniel Jones	Black		March 15, 1889	Clark	Murder	Otto Horton, black	James Philip Eagle
Malachi Allen	Black		April 19, 1889	N/A	Murder	Shadrach Peters and Cy Love, white	James Philip Eagle
James Mills	Black		April 19, 1889	N/A	Murder	John Windham, white	James Philip Eagle
Jack Spaniard	Native American	28	August 30, 1889	N/A	Murder	William Irwin, white (deputy marshal)	James Philip Eagle
William Walker	Black		August 30, 1889	N/A	Murder	Calvin Church, white	James Philip Eagle

=== 1890s ===
Name	Race	Age	Date of execution	County	Crime	Victim(s)	Governor
Harris Austin	Native American	40	January 16, 1890	N/A	Murder	Thomas Elliott, white	James Philip Eagle
John Billee	Native American		January 16, 1890	N/A	Murder-Robbery	W. P. Williams, white	James Philip Eagle
Thomas Willis	Native American		January 16, 1890	N/A	Murder-Robbery	W. P. Williams, white	James Philip Eagle
Jefferson Jones	Native American		January 16, 1890	N/A	Murder-Robbery	Henry Wilson, elderly, white	James Philip Eagle
Sam Goin	Native American		January 16, 1890	N/A	Murder	Houston Joyce, white	James Philip Eagle
Jimmon Burris	Native American		January 16, 1890	N/A	Murder	Houston Joyce, white	James Philip Eagle
George Tobler	Black		January 30, 1890	N/A	Murder	Irvin Richmond, black	James Philip Eagle
John King	Black		February 21, 1890	Mississippi	Murder	Mrs. Warrenton, her son, and her daughter, 14 (son) and 10 (daughter), white	James Philip Eagle
Boudinot Crumpton	White		June 30, 1890	N/A	Murder-Robbery	Sam Morgan, white	James Philip Eagle
John Stansberry	White		July 9, 1890	N/A	Murder	Female, white (wife) (Note: Also murdered their infant child.)	James Philip Eagle
Robert Williams	Black	24	July 15, 1891	Jefferson	Murder	Alfred Hayes, black	James Philip Eagle
Isom White	Black		July 31, 1891	Phillips	Murder-Robbery	Prince Malloy, 59, black	James Philip Eagle
Sheppard Busby	White		April 27, 1892	N/A	Murder	Barney Connelly, white (U.S. Marshal)	James Philip Eagle
Thomas Bailey	Black		May 6, 1892	Pulaski	Murder	J. F. Hackman, white	James Philip Eagle
L. D. Slaughter	Black		May 6, 1892	Pulaski	Murder	Jennie Love, black (mistress)	James Philip Eagle
J. Edward Speers	White	29	May 27, 1892	Columbia	Murder	J. B. Hunt, white	James Philip Eagle
John Thornton	White	65	June 28, 1892	N/A	Murder	Laura Moonie, white (daughter)	James Philip Eagle
William Black	Black		June 28, 1892	Jefferson	Murder	Georgia Smith, 16, black (stepdaughter)	James Philip Eagle
Charles Hudspeth	White		December 30, 1892	Boone	Murder (Note: The victim's body was never found, and he was reportedly later found alive. However, this story was subsequently determined to be a hoax.)	George Watkins, white	James Philip Eagle
Nathan Carter	Black		January 19, 1893	Phillips	Murder-Robbery	Prince Malloy, 59, black	William Meade Fishback
Luke Tatum	Black		January 31, 1893	Ouachita (Note: Change of venue from Union County.)	Murder	Eliza Tatum, black (wife)	William Meade Fishback
Charles Caldwell	Black		April 27, 1893	Craighead	Murder	Tobe Freeman, white	William Meade Fishback
William Smith	Black	40-50	September 8, 1893	Ouachita	Murder	E. B. Pierce, white	William Meade Fishback
Miller Davis	White		November 10, 1893	Howard (Note: Change of venue from Sevier County.)	Murder	John C. Dollarhide, 25, white (deputy sheriff)	William Meade Fishback
Thomas Brady	White		April 6, 1894	Jackson	Murder-Robbery	William P. McNally, 60, white	William Meade Fishback
Albert Mansker	White		April 6, 1894	Jackson	Murder-Robbery	William P. McNally, 60, white	William Meade Fishback
Jim L. Wyrick	White		April 6, 1894	Jackson	Murder-Robbery	William P. McNally, 60, white	William Meade Fishback
Samuel Vaughan	White	44	April 27, 1894	Washington	Murder	William A. Gage, white	William Meade Fishback
Lewis Holder	White	55	July 25, 1894	N/A	Murder-Robbery	George Bickford, white	William Meade Fishback
Phillip Pettus	Mixed (Note: Mulatto.)	42	August 24, 1894	Phillips	Murder	Emma Pettus, 37, black (wife)	William Meade Fishback
John Pointer	White	21	September 20, 1894	N/A	Murder	William Bolding and Ed Vandever, white	William Meade Fishback
Thomas Watkins	Black		March 8, 1895	Pulaski	Murder	Mr. O'Bannon, elderly, white	James Paul Clarke
George Whittaker	White		April 25, 1895	Conway	Murder	Male, white (father-in-law) (Note: Serial killer, also reported to have committed two other murders in Texas and Indian Territory respectively.)	James Paul Clarke
William Owens	Black		May 30, 1895	Lincoln	Murder	Female, black (wife)	James Paul Clarke
William Downs	Black		June 7, 1895	Conway	Rape	Paulina Bridelbaugh, white	James Paul Clarke
Anthony Johnson	Black	43	June 21, 1895	Desha	Murder	Howard Johnson, 39, black	James Paul Clarke
William Newman	White		November 8, 1895	Van Buren	Murder	Mary Newman, white (wife)	James Paul Clarke
Amos Dupree	Black		November 15, 1895	Prairie (Note: Change of venue from Monroe County.)	Murder	Robert Harris, black	James Paul Clarke
Jesse Jones	White	21	December 6, 1895	Franklin	Murder	Charles and Jesse Hibdon, white	James Paul Clarke
George Ward	Mixed (Note: Half Native American and half white ("halfbreed Cherokee Indian").)	19	January 24, 1896	Crawford	Murder	Henry Bacon, white (Note: Serial killer, previously committed three other murders dating back to age 10.)	James Paul Clarke
Pruitt Turner	Black		February 28, 1896	Crawford	Murder	Bob Hawkins, white	James Paul Clarke
Crawford Goldsby	Native American	20	March 17, 1896	N/A	Murder	Ernest Melton, white (Note: Serial killer, later murdered prison guard Lawrence Keating during an escape attempt; also sentenced to death for this murder but executed only for Melton's.)	James Paul Clarke
Marshall Anderson	Black	25	April 24, 1896	Hot Spring	Murder	John Henson, black (brother-in-law)	James Paul Clarke
Webber Isaacs	Native American		April 30, 1896	N/A	Murder	Mike Cushing, 60, white	James Paul Clarke
George Pierce	White		April 30, 1896	N/A	Murder-Robbery	William Vandever, white	James Paul Clarke
John Pierce	White		April 30, 1896	N/A	Murder-Robbery	William Vandever, white	James Paul Clarke
Jordan Phillips	Black	40	May 22, 1896	Arkansas	Murder	Female, black (wife)	James Paul Clarke
Rufus Buck	Native American	20	July 1, 1896	N/A	Rape	Rosetta Hassan, 23, white (Note: Known as the "Rufus Buck Gang", this group committed at least two murders along with numerous robberies and several other rapes in the two proceeding weeks. Buck and the Davis brothers each received an additional death sentence for the murder of Deputy U.S. Marshal John Garrett.)	James Paul Clarke
Lewis Davis	Native American		July 1, 1896	N/A	Rape	Rosetta Hassan, 23, white	James Paul Clarke
Lucky Davis	Black		July 1, 1896	N/A	Rape	Rosetta Hassan, 23, white	James Paul Clarke
Maoma July	Native American		July 1, 1896	N/A	Rape	Rosetta Hassan, 23, white	James Paul Clarke
Sam Sampson	Native American		July 1, 1896	N/A	Rape	Rosetta Hassan, 23, white	James Paul Clarke
George Wilson	White	27	July 30, 1896	N/A	Murder-Robbery	Zachariah W. Thatch, white	James Paul Clarke
Charles Hamilton	White		September 11, 1896	Logan (Note: Change of venue from Franklin County.)	Murder	Mr. McAbee, elderly, white	James Paul Clarke
Jim Davis	Black		February 25, 1897	Jefferson	Murder	Lawrence Williams, child, white	Daniel Webster Jones
Robert Cox	Black		February 25, 1897	Jefferson	Rape	Mrs. R. G. Orr, black	Daniel Webster Jones
William Johnson	Black		March 19, 1897	Ashley	Murder	Henry Hobson, black	Daniel Webster Jones
Albert Yeargin	Black		June 17, 1898	Mississippi	Murder	Avery Tobin, black	Daniel Webster Jones
Ellis Rose	Black		July 7, 1898	Craighead (Note: Change of venue from Crittenden County.)	Murder	Henry Sutton, black	Daniel Webster Jones
Charles Clyburn	White		August 5, 1898	Nevada (Note: Change of venue from Clark County.)	Murder	Sol W. Rollins, white (deputy)	Daniel Webster Jones
Fluke Fleming	Black		August 5, 1898	Pulaski (Note: Change of venue from Desha County.)	Rape	Nellie Walls, 14, black	Daniel Webster Jones
Lee Mills	White		September 16, 1898	Cleburne (Note: Change of venue from Van Buren County.)	Murder	Hugh Patterson, 60, white	Daniel Webster Jones
Alex Brinkley	White		October 14, 1898	Conway	Murder	Dr. G. C. Chaness, white	Daniel Webster Jones
Charles Munn	Black		December 2, 1898	Phillips	Murder-Robbery	Frank Dubarry, white	Daniel Webster Jones
John Maxey	Black		August 4, 1899	Crawford	Rape	Hulda Meier, 70, white	Daniel Webster Jones
Douglas Clark	Black		December 1, 1899	Chicot	Murder	John Holland, white	Daniel Webster Jones

=== 1900s ===
Arkansas abolished public hangings in 1901 with the exception of hangings for rape until 1906.

Public hangings for rape

Name	Race	Age	Date of execution	County	Crime	Victim(s)	Governor
Walter French	Black		January 26, 1900	Mississippi	Murder	Female, black (wife)	Daniel Webster Jones
Hardy Westbrook	Black		January 11, 1901	Crittenden	Murder	Female, black (stepdaughter)	Daniel Webster Jones
Joshua James	Black		March 1, 1901	Chicot	Murder	Female, black (wife)	Jeff Davis
Kirby Graves	Black		March 8, 1901	Little River	Murder	Edward Evans, white	Jeff Davis
Bill Johnson	Black		March 8, 1901	Little River	Murder	Edward Evans, white	Jeff Davis
Henry Brooks	Black		March 8, 1901	Little River	Murder	Frank Hopson, black	Jeff Davis
John Wesley	Black	28	March 23, 1901	Clark	Rape	Josie Cleveland, 17, white (Note: Serial rapist, confessed to raping two other white women, Mrs. W. P. Bullard and Mrs. Graves, before his execution.)	Jeff Davis
William Black	Black		April 10, 1901	Columbia	Murder	Ivy Young, white	Jeff Davis
Henry Wilson	Black		April 10, 1901	Columbia	Murder	Ivy Young, white	Jeff Davis
John Bateman	Black		June 28, 1901	Crittenden	Murder	Female, black (wife)	Jeff Davis
Charles Anderson	Black	21	July 26, 1901	Pulaski	Rape	Belle Edwards, 17, white	Jeff Davis
Essex Pippin	Black	19	October 11, 1901	Cross	Rape	Leah Wooden and Mrs. Allen Taylor, black and white	Jeff Davis
Bud Wilson	Black		December 6, 1901	Yell	Murder	Robert H. Taylor, white (deputy warden)	Jeff Davis
Frank Cannon	Black		December 13, 1901	Phillips	Murder	Isaac and Sally Lane, elderly, black	Jeff Davis
William Kelley	Black		December 13, 1901	Phillips	Murder	Isaac and Sally Lane, elderly, black	Jeff Davis
Jasper Copeland	Black		January 24, 1902	Mississippi	Criminal assault	Unknown (Note: Confessed to several other unspecified crimes before execution.)	Jeff Davis
David Jobe	Black		February 28, 1902	Desha	Murder	John Jackson, black	Jeff Davis
Lawrence Dunlap	Black		February 28, 1902	Desha	Murder-Robbery	Nathan Smith, 23, black	Jeff Davis
Kit Helton	White	55	March 7, 1902	Crawford	Murder	Ella Helton, white (wife)	Jeff Davis
Henry LeSane	Black	24	May 16, 1902	Lee	Murder	John Greenwood, 36, black	Jeff Davis
James Kitts	Black		July 25, 1902	Desha	Murder	James Johnson, black	Jeff Davis
David McWhorter	White	60	July 25, 1902	Crawford	Murder	Mary McWhorter, wife (white)	Jeff Davis
Lathe Hembree	White		July 25, 1902	Howard (Note: Change of venue from Polk County.)	Murder-Robbery	W. M. Willis, white	Jeff Davis
Dee Noland	Black		July 25, 1902	Hempstead	Murder	Annie Noland, black (wife)	Jeff Davis
Tom Simms	Black		July 25, 1902	Hempstead	Murder	Nancy and Tabitha Jeton, black	Jeff Davis
Sy Tanner	Mixed (Note: Mulatto.)	25	July 25, 1902	St. Francis	Murder	Robert Black, 16, black (brother-in-law)	Jeff Davis
Jerry Carter	Black		September 19, 1902	Chicot	Murder	Thomas Keough, white	Jeff Davis
Wallace Grant	Black		September 26, 1902	Jackson	Murder	Essex Powell, black	Jeff Davis
Hall Mahone	Black	22	November 7, 1902	Crawford	Rape	Rebecca McCloud, 16, white	Jeff Davis
David Cross	Black		December 12, 1902	Cross	Murder-Rape	Three females, minors, black	Jeff Davis
James Ruffin	Black		March 20, 1903	Lincoln	Murder	Don McGhee, white	Jeff Davis
James Greene	Black	17	March 20, 1903	Lincoln	Murder	Don McGhee, white	Jeff Davis
George Durham	White	40	June 19, 1903	Johnson	Murder-Robbery	John Powers, 38, white (sheriff)	Jeff Davis
Frederick Underwood	White	27	June 19, 1903	Johnson	Murder-Robbery	John Powers, 38, white (sheriff)	Jeff Davis
Will Diamond	Black		August 14, 1903	Crittenden	Murder	Female, black (wife)	Jeff Davis
Jim Williams	Black		September 4, 1903	Desha	Murder	Floyd Cheffey, black	Jeff Davis
John Bell	Black	19	January 28, 1904	Monroe	Murder	Winnie Gideon, white	Jeff Davis
Pink Williams	Black		April 15, 1904	Phillips	Murder	Female, black (wife)	Jeff Davis
Bill Jones	Black		April 15, 1904	Lawrence	Murder	Asbury Hoskins, black	Jeff Davis
Mart Vowell	White	61	June 9, 1904	Greene (Note: Change of venue from Clay County.)	Murder (Note: An initial grand jury indicted Vowell thrice for second-degree murder, after which a second one was formed which immediately indicted Vowell for first-degree murder.)	William F. Lovejoy, white	Jeff Davis
Elisha Davis	Black		June 25, 1904	Jefferson	Rape	Katie Ross, 14, white	Jeff Davis
Albert Matthews	Black	30	July 7, 1904	Union	Murder	Edward Yount, white	Jeff Davis
Nathan Brewer	White	30	July 9, 1904	Greene (Note: Change of venue from Clay County.)	Murder-Robbery	Bud Dortch, elderly, white	Jeff Davis
John Harper	Black		October 12, 1904	Columbia	Murder	Female, black (wife)	Jeff Davis
Robert Causby	White	21	November 25, 1904	Independence	Murder	Jefferson Davis Morgan Sr., 41, white (sheriff)	Jeff Davis
Ed Huey	Black	27	December 2, 1904	Union	Murder	Lawrence Johnson, white (Huttig city marshal)	Jeff Davis
Will Jones	Black		December 16, 1904	Phillips	Murder	A. W. Robertson, white	Jeff Davis
John Carter	Black		February 7, 1905	Lee	Murder	James Woods, white	Jeff Davis
Charles Hammons	White	28	March 7, 1905	Conway	Rape	Zelma Thomas, 11, white (stepdaughter)	Jeff Davis
William Buckner	Black		March 10, 1905	Ashley	Murder-Robbery	Joseph Burton, Hispanic	Jeff Davis
Elias Powell	Black		April 6, 1905	Miller	Murder	J. M. Gardner, white	Jeff Davis
John Frazier	Black		June 8, 1905	Prairie	Murder	Webster Sutherland, white	Jeff Davis
Walter Weldon	Black		July 12, 1905	Union	Murder	Lizzie Cantley, black	Jeff Davis
William Robertson	Black		August 7, 1905	Phillips	Murder	Female, black (wife)	Jeff Davis
Thomas Wilson	Black		August 7, 1905	Phillips	Murder	Male, black (brother)	Jeff Davis
Kyle Moore	Black		August 22, 1905	Union	Murder-Robbery	Lige Moore, black	Jeff Davis
James Ince	White	30	April 4, 1906	Yell	Murder	Four people, white (Note: His wife Sarah Ince and their three children, ages four months to four years old.)	Jeff Davis
James Alexander	Black		April 27, 1906	Chicot	Murder	Mary Bird, black	Jeff Davis
"Jack the Bear" (Note: Real name unknown.)	Black		July 20, 1906	Mississippi	Murder	Carl Mathis, white	Jeff Davis
Charles Beene	Black		August 15, 1906	Union	Murder	Susie Beene, black (wife)	Jeff Davis
Martin Nash	Black		July 11, 1906	Desha	Murder (Note: Originally indicted for manslaughter.)	James Cross, white	Jeff Davis
Frank Rogers	Black	42	November 30, 1906	St. Francis	Murder	Male, black (son) (Note: The victim was an illegitimate child he had fathered with his own stepdaughter.)	Jeff Davis
Lum Duckworth	Black		December 4, 1906	Ashley	Murder	Thomas Howie, white (deputy sheriff)	Jeff Davis
Rafe Wood	Black	20	February 26, 1908	Calhoun	Rape	Fannie Dorris, white (Note: Serial rapist, also confessed at his execution to assaulting a black woman.)	Jeff Davis
John Hughes	Black		January 19, 1909	Crittenden	Murder	Cecil Doughey, white (convict guard)	George Washington Donaghey
Tom Kiser	Black		January 19, 1909	Crittenden	Murder	Cecil Doughey, white (convict guard)	George Washington Donaghey
Joe Thompson	Black		January 22, 1909	Hempstead	Murder	Miller Brown, black	George Washington Donaghey
P. G. Nichols	White		February 9, 1909	Crittenden	Murder	Ed Smith, 15, white (Note: Intended victim was Ed's father, S. L. Smith.)	George Washington Donaghey
Charles Stinnett	Black	24	March 24, 1909	Boone	Rape	Mrs. Lovett, 61, white	George Washington Donaghey
Isaac Stevens	Black		July 16, 1909	Phillips	Murder	Eleanor Jenkins, black	George Washington Donaghey
Samuel Blakeley	Black		October 8, 1909	Ashley	Murder	Walter Caiu, white (deputy sheriff)	George Washington Donaghey

=== 1910s ===
Name	Race	Age	Date of execution	County	Crime	Victim(s)	Governor
Henry Crosby			January 1, 1910	Mississippi	Murder		George Washington Donaghey
Charles Mullins	Black		January 19, 1910	Mississippi	Murder-Robbery	Josie Cummings and Alexander Robertson, white	George Washington Donaghey
Will Mullins	Black		January 19, 1910	Mississippi	Murder-Robbery	Josie Cummings and Alexander Robertson, white	George Washington Donaghey
Walter Hogue	White	22	March 11, 1910	Perry	Murder-Robbery	Grover Misner, 17 white	George Washington Donaghey
Henry Harding	White	62	May 6, 1910	Cross	Murder	J. T. Patterson, 60, white	George Washington Donaghey
Scott Turner	Black		May 7, 1910	Chicot	Murder	Webb Givens, white	George Washington Donaghey
Charles Smith	Black		May 7, 1910	Chicot	Murder	Frank Green, black	George Washington Donaghey
John Adkins	White	45	May 26, 1910	Perry	Murder	William Jones Sr., white (brother-in-law)	George Washington Donaghey
C. M. Miller	White		August 12, 1910	Poinsett	Murder-Robbery	A. H. Flood, 60, white	George Washington Donaghey
Harry Poe	Black	17	September 2, 1910	Garland	Rape	Lena Adams, 12, white	George Washington Donaghey
A. J. Coughran	White	59	November 16, 1910	Montgomery	Murder	Allen Stacy, white	George Washington Donaghey
Thomas Pearce	White		April 21, 1911	Little River	Murder	Female, white (wife)	George Washington Donaghey
Pleas Veaudoo	Black		April 21, 1911	Pulaski	Rape	Tillie Miller, white	George Washington Donaghey
Richard Ruffin	Black		April 29, 1911	Chicot	Rape	Female, white	George Washington Donaghey
James Blackburn	Black		June 30, 1911	Jefferson	Murder-Robbery	John and Mary Gordon, black (uncle and aunt)	George Washington Donaghey
Jesse Smith	Black		December 15, 1911	Lee	Murder	Cheatham Hines, white	George Washington Donaghey
Ned Ringer	Black		December 15, 1911	Lee	Murder	Female, black (wife)	George Washington Donaghey
Henry Hill	Black		December 15, 1911	Lee	Murder	Male, black	George Washington Donaghey
Charley Harris	Black		January 5, 1912	Monroe	Rape	Female, white	George Washington Donaghey
Turner Alexander	Black	18	January 5, 1912	Mississippi	Murder	John Yates, white	George Washington Donaghey
John McElvain	White		January 26, 1912	Mississippi	Murder	Jake Thompson, white	George Washington Donaghey
Henry Coats	White		January 26, 1912	Mississippi	Murder	R. L. Ferguson, white (police officer)	George Washington Donaghey
Sylvester Thomas	Black		January 26, 1912	Phillips	Rape	Fannie Lindley, white	George Washington Donaghey
W. T. Nichols	White	38	June 7, 1912	Jefferson	Murder	Minnie Nichols, white (wife)	George Washington Donaghey
Tim Powell	Black		June 21, 1912	Lee (Note: Change of venue from Pulaski County.)	Murder	Albert Covington, black (father-in-law)	George Washington Donaghey
Dink Jackson	Black		July 5, 1912	St. Francis	Murder	Noah Powell, black	George Washington Donaghey
Andrew Reed	Black		July 5, 1912	St. Francis	Murder	Female, black (wife)	George Washington Donaghey
Amos Spinks	Black	55	September 27, 1912	Pulaski	Murder	Pollie Spinks, black (wife)	George Washington Donaghey
Harvey Woods	Black		September 27, 1912	Prairie	Murder	Kirk Morford, white	George Washington Donaghey
Ferdinand Glaubitz	White	65	November 1, 1912	Franklin	Murder	Female, white (wife)	George Washington Donaghey
Dock Driver	White	37	January 31, 1913	Lawrence	Murder	J. P. Biggers, 65, white (Walnut Ridge marshal)	Joseph Taylor Robinson
James Scott	White		May 30, 1913	Craighead	Murder	Female, white (wife)	Junius Marion Futrell
Clarence Schumann	White		June 2, 1913	Garland	Murder	Lula Schumann, white (wife)	Junius Marion Futrell
Elijah Wood	Black	36	July 14, 1913	Pulaski	Murder	Alice Turner, black (Note: Suspected serial killer, shortly before his own execution, Wood's cellmate, Alvin Gaylord, said he had confessed to the murders of Clara Diehl, Arthur Hatton, and Yancey Mashburn in 1910.)	Junius Marion Futrell
Alvin Gaylord	Black		July 28, 1913	Conway	Murder-Robbery	Herbert Williams, white	Junius Marion Futrell
Odus Davidson	White	30	August 11, 1913	Boone	Murder-Rape	Ella Barham, 18, white	George Washington Hays

== Electrocution ==
In May 1913, Arkansas officially replaced local hangings with centralized electrocution, with all executions moved to a single execution chamber at the state penitentiary in Little Rock. A test electrocution was carried out on a steer and its first execution that September cost the state $702. State law also prohibited newspapers from publishing details of the executions. Hanging remained in use until the transition was completed, and a few more hangings were carried out by exception for convictions prior to the change. In 1933, the electric chair, nicknamed "Old Sparky", was moved from the state penitentiary to Tucker Prison Farm.

Executions by hanging

Name	Race	Age	Date of execution	County	Crime	Victim(s)	Governor
Lee Simms	Black	21	September 5, 1913	Prairie	Rape	Female, white	George Washington Hays
Omer Davis	White	18	September 11, 1913	Logan	Murder	Nellie Moneyhun, 25, white	George Washington Hays
Ed King	Black	19	December 12, 1913	Ashley	Murder	Will Woods, white (deputy sheriff)	George Washington Hays
Will King	Black		March 4, 1914	Poinsett	Murder	James Chandler, white (deputy sheriff) (Note: Serial killer. Killed a white man in Alabama and was sentenced to life imprisonment but was released after a tuberculosis diagnosis, moving to Arkansas where the climate helped him recover. Suspected of killing two other men in Arkansas and killed another man in Missouri while a fugitive.)	George Washington Hays
Fred Pelton	Black	37	March 28, 1914	Lincoln	Murder	Melvina Hatton, black	George Washington Hays
Arthur Tillman	White	23	July 15, 1914	Logan	Murder	Amanda Stephens, 19, white (girlfriend)	George Washington Hays
Will Neeley	Black	57	December 8, 1914	Union	Murder	Mr. Sorrells, white (deputy sheriff)	George Washington Hays
Arthur Hodges	White	21	December 18, 1914	Clark	Murder	William Morgan Garner, 39, white (constable)	George Washington Hays
Clay Simms	Black	48	March 19, 1915	Desha	Murder	Female, black	George Washington Hays
Walter Owens	Black		April 2, 1915	Craighead	Murder	Laura Cogsdale, white	George Washington Hays
John Hall	Black		April 2, 1915	Craighead	Murder	Walter Robinson, black	George Washington Hays
Sam Derrick	White	30	July 28, 1915	Monroe	Murder	John Verdun, white	George Washington Hays
John Hawkins	Black	24	March 13, 1917	Little River	Murder-Robbery	Mrs. Diles and her daughter, 1 (daughter), white	Charles Hillman Brough
Henry Smith	Black	37	March 31, 1917	Crittenden	Murder	Female, black (wife)	Charles Hillman Brough
Aaron Johnson	Black	45	June 22, 1917	Desha (Note: Change of venue from Jefferson County.)	Murder	R. L. Rutherford, white	Charles Hillman Brough
Tom Diggs	Black	39	June 22, 1917	Conway	Murder	Mrs. R. L. Hoggard, 78, white	Charles Hillman Brough
Solomon Daffron	Black	36	July 26, 1918	Polk	Murder	A. D. Boatner, white	Charles Hillman Brough
Ben Caughron	White	28	August 23, 1918	Polk	Murder	Charles Kirkland, white (deputy sheriff)	Charles Hillman Brough
Vick Tobay	Native American	24	August 14, 1920	Washington	Murder-Robbery	C. C. Smith, white	Charles Hillman Brough
Charlie Cooper	Black		November 19, 1920	Ouachita	Murder	Ollie Pickett, white	Charles Hillman Brough
Revertia Reynolds	Black	21	April 29, 1921	Lincoln	Murder	Earl Thompson, black	Thomas Chipman McRae
Virgil Clarke	Black	36	June 17, 1921	Chicot	Murder	Theresa Clemons, black (common-law wife)	Thomas Chipman McRae
Amos Ratcliff	White	24	October 14, 1921	Carroll	Murder	Winford Frazier, white	Thomas Chipman McRae
John Price	Black	20	December 30, 1921	Phillips	Murder	C. Moody, white	Thomas Chipman McRae
James Wells	Black	18	March 10, 1922	Drew	Murder	Peter Trene, white	Thomas Chipman McRae
Ben Richardson	White	19	February 2, 1923	Ashley	Murder	Ira N. Culp, white	Thomas Chipman McRae
Duncan Richardson	White	29	February 2, 1923	Ashley	Murder	Ira N. Culp, white	Thomas Chipman McRae
F. G. Bullen	White	50	February 2, 1923	Ashley	Murder	Ira N. Culp, white	Thomas Chipman McRae
Will DeBord	White	22	February 2, 1923	Stone	Murder	Mr. and Mrs. William Silsby, white	Thomas Chipman McRae
Herbert Sease	White	40	July 27, 1923	Baxter	Murder	R. H. Davidson, white	Thomas Chipman McRae
John Owens	White	51	August 24, 1923	Little River	Murder	Hugh Throckmorton, white	Thomas Chipman McRae
Joe Sullivan	White	34	April 18, 1924	Pulaski	Murder	George W. Moore, white (sergeant detective)	Thomas Chipman McRae
Will Bettis	Black	35	June 27, 1924	Crawford	Murder-Rape	Effie Mitchell Latimer, 25, white	Thomas Chipman McRae
Spurgeon Rucks	Black	27	June 27, 1924	Crawford	Murder-Rape	Effie Mitchell Latimer, 25, white	Thomas Chipman McRae
Park Flowers	Black	22	June 26, 1925	Columbia	Murder	Ed Shirley, white	Tom Terral
Jack Buster	Black	20	June 26, 1925	Jefferson	Murder	Grover C. Payne, white	Tom Terral
J. C. Kelley	White	30	November 13, 1925	Pulaski	Murder-Robbery	James Harrod Fretwell, 19, white	Tom Terral
Tyrus Clark	White	28	January 8, 1926	Benton	Murder-Robbery	L. M. Stout, white	Tom Terral
Aaron Harris	Black		January 8, 1926	Ashley	Murder	Scott Struter, white (deputy sheriff)	Tom Terral
Lee Walker	Black	23	February 5, 1926	Union	Murder-Robbery	Ira M. Hudson, 45, white	Tom Terral
Roy Edmons	Black	24	February 5, 1926	Union	Murder-Robbery	Ira M. Hudson, 45, white	Tom Terral
Clint Mason	Black	21	February 12, 1926	Ouachita	Murder	James M. Moore, 65, white	Tom Terral
Ishman Jones	Black	23	February 12, 1926	Ouachita	Murder	James M. Moore, 65, white	Tom Terral
Cephus Johnson	Black	26	February 12, 1926	Ouachita	Murder	James M. Moore, 65, white	Tom Terral
John Canady	Black	31	February 12, 1926	Ouachita	Murder	James M. Moore, 65, white	Tom Terral
Albert Jones	Black	37	June 9, 1926	Mississippi	Murder	Female, black	Tom Terral
Willie Martin	Black	36	June 9, 1926	Pulaski	Murder	Lena Blevins, 28, white (Note: Suspected in five other similar murders, but denied any involvement.)	Tom Terral
Lonnie Dixon	Mixed (Note: "Light-skinned mulatto" of white, black, and native ancestry.)	18	June 24, 1927	Pulaski	Murder-Rape	Floella McDonald, 12, white	John Ellis Martineau
Horace Cathey	Black	20	September 2, 1927	Monroe	Murder	Lewis Wilson, white	John Ellis Martineau
Booker Martin	Black	25	September 2, 1927	Monroe	Murder	Lewis Wilson, white	John Ellis Martineau
Will McKenzie	Black	55	March 30, 1928	Ouachita	Murder	Male, black	Harvey Parnell
Willie Eutsey	Black	21	March 30, 1928	Ouachita	Murder	Male, white	Harvey Parnell
Sinner Brown	Black		July 10, 1928	Hempstead	Murder	Beatrice Blake, black	Harvey Parnell
Pete Robinson	Black	30	September 10, 1928	Union	Murder-Robbery	J. H. Brock, white	Harvey Parnell
Ben Evers	Black	22	January 24, 1930	Arkansas	Murder	Perry Miller, white (DeWitt city marshal)	Harvey Parnell
John Green	Black	28	March 21, 1930	Little River	Murder-Robbery	Ed Dubley and Bud Morgan, 25 and 50, white	Harvey Parnell
Mack Brown	Black	27	March 21, 1930	Little River	Murder-Robbery	Ed Dubley and Bud Morgan, 25 and 50, white	Harvey Parnell
Ambrosia Alford	Black	30	June 20, 1930	Ouachita	Murder-Robbery	Sam Katz, white	Harvey Parnell
Bud Nolan	Black	42	July 25, 1930	Little River	Murder-Robbery	Ed Dubley and Bud Morgan, 25 and 50, white	Harvey Parnell
W. H. Howell	White	62	August 15, 1930	Crawford	Murder	Three people, white (Note: 43-year-old Cliff Deffenbaugh, his 24-year-old wife Ida, and 60-year-old John Nicholson. Deffenbaugh was superintendent of the county infirmary and Nicholson was a resident.)	Harvey Parnell
George Washington	Black	30	November 14, 1930	Pulaski	Murder-Robbery	W. H. Roberts, white	Harvey Parnell
James Turnage	Black	29	November 14, 1930	Pulaski	Murder-Robbery	W. H. Roberts, white	Harvey Parnell
Eddie Long	Black	30	November 14, 1930	Pulaski	Murder-Robbery	John W. Reed, white (alderman)	Harvey Parnell
Willie Davis	Black		November 14, 1930	Pulaski	Murder-Robbery	John W. Reed, white (alderman)	Harvey Parnell
James Lawson	Black	26	July 31, 1931	Bradley	Murder	Jack Martin, white	Harvey Parnell
Louis McBride	Black	36	July 8, 1932	Clark	Murder	William McClain, white	Harvey Parnell
Freeling Daniels	Black	34	November 25, 1932 (Note: Last execution at the old state penitentiary in Little Rock.)	Miller	Rape	Female, 13, white	Harvey Parnell
George Hill	Black	19	June 30, 1933 (Note: First execution at Tucker Prison Farm.)	Phillips	Rape	Female, white	Junius Marion Futrell
Woodie Williams	Black	40	July 14, 1933	Pulaski	Murder-Robbery	Carthel H. Atwood, 20, white	Junius Marion Futrell
Len McDaniels	Black		December 8, 1933	Lonoke	Murder	Male, white (deputy sheriff)	Junius Marion Futrell
J. C. Banks	Black	24	December 8, 1933	Pulaski	Murder	Mark M. Goodson, 44, white	Junius Marion Futrell
Benjamin Butler	Black	29	February 9, 1934	Craighead	Murder	Mildred Temple, black	Junius Marion Futrell
Luther Jackson	Black	25	May 11, 1934	Pulaski	Murder-Robbery	Phillip Windecker, 72, white	Junius Marion Futrell
Purcell Mitchell	Black	21	November 2, 1934	Union	Murder-Robbery	Lee L. Ward, 69, white	Junius Marion Futrell
Robert Rose	White	27	February 23, 1935	Independence	Murder	Everett Wheeler, white (deputy sheriff)	Junius Marion Futrell
Frank Barnes	White	50	March 1, 1935	Mississippi	Murder-Robbery	C. A. Martin, white	Junius Marion Futrell
Mark Shank	White	43	March 8, 1935	Saline	Murder	Four people, white (Note: Alvin Colley, his wife Ethel, and their sons Clarence (8) and Clement (6).)	Junius Marion Futrell
Tom Freeman	Black	28	August 23, 1935	Chicot	Murder	Armanda Brown, black (common-law wife)	Junius Marion Futrell
Paul Nelson	White	23	September 28, 1935	Jackson	Murder-Robbery	B. F. Mitchell, white	Junius Marion Futrell
Bill Barnes	White	22	September 28, 1935	Mississippi	Murder-Robbery	C. A. Martin, white	Junius Marion Futrell
Frank Dobbs	White	40	November 11, 1935	Saline	Murder-Robbery	Fannie Orr, white	Junius Marion Futrell
Mack Nelson	Black	23	December 13, 1935	Mississippi	Murder	Male and female, black	Junius Marion Futrell
Ben Hawkins	Black	37	December 13, 1935	Mississippi	Murder	Male and female, black	Junius Marion Futrell
Roy House	White	22	October 23, 1936	Garland	Murder-Robbery	Tom Menser, white	Junius Marion Futrell
Dennis Turner	White	47	November 6, 1936	Calhoun	Murder	Female, 32, white (ex-wife)	Junius Marion Futrell
Farlander McCormick	Black	35	December 11, 1936	Drew	Murder-Robbery	Emmaline Lee, 80, black	Junius Marion Futrell
Beverly White	Black	25	December 11, 1936	Drew	Murder-Robbery	Emmaline Lee, 80, black	Junius Marion Futrell
Willie Smith	Black	25	December 11, 1936	Drew	Murder-Robbery	Emmaline Lee, 80, black	Junius Marion Futrell
Clinton Medlock	Black	29	April 23, 1937	Calhoun	Murder	Roy Speer, white	Carl E. Bailey
James Austin Jr.	Black	22	May 14, 1937	Garland	Murder-Robbery	John McTigrit, 55, white (Hot Springs police officer)	Carl E. Bailey
Tom M. Hutto	White	56	September 3, 1937	Union	Murder	James A. Yocom, 40, white (El Dorado night patrolman)	Carl E. Bailey
Sandy Edwards	Black	65	September 24, 1937	Hempstead	Murder	Cross Lamb, white	Carl E. Bailey
Jessie Amos	Black	35	October 15, 1937	Lonoke	Rape	Female, 14, white	Carl E. Bailey
Duncan Pigue	Black	24	February 4, 1938	Lonoke	Murder	J. Robert Bennett, white (Lonoke city marshal)	Carl E. Bailey
Leroy Ware	Black	21	February 25, 1938	Ashley	Murder	F. A. N. Yeager, white (Boydell postmaster)	Carl E. Bailey
Willie Noble	Black	25	March 11, 1938	Miller	Murder-Robbery	Joseph Hawkes, 61, white	Carl E. Bailey
Lester Brockelhurst	White	24	March 18, 1938	Lonoke	Murder-Robbery	Victor Gates, 57, white (Note: Serial killer, also committed two other murders in Illinois and Texas.)	Carl E. Bailey
Joe Sims	White	30	March 18, 1938	Saline	Murder	Female, white (wife)	Carl E. Bailey
Frank Carter	Black	26	June 24, 1938	Crittenden	Rape	Female, white	Carl E. Bailey
Theo Thomas	Black	28	June 24, 1938	Crittenden	Rape	Female, white	Carl E. Bailey
Joe Anderson	White	37	March 10, 1939	Garland	Murder-Robbery	Eldon Cooley, 26, white (Note: Joe Anderson was a serial killer, he also confessed to murdering taxi driver John Colla in Gary, Indiana and a Detroit motorist on a "hit" contract.)	Carl E. Bailey
Fred Dickerson	White	35	May 19, 1939	Garland	Murder-Robbery	Eldon Cooley, 26, white	Carl E. Bailey
Fred Arnell	Black	18	May 19, 1939	Miller	Rape	Female, white	Carl E. Bailey
Sylvester Williams	Black	19	June 30, 1939	Jefferson	Murder-Rape	Irene Taylor, 19, white	Carl E. Bailey
Bubbles Clayton	Black	25	June 30, 1939	Mississippi	Rape	Virgie Terry, 19, white	Carl E. Bailey
James Caruthers	Black	23	June 30, 1939	Mississippi	Rape	Virgie Terry, 19, white	Carl E. Bailey
Milton Williams	Black	27	August 18, 1939	Pulaski	Murder-Rape	Ruthie Mae Brooks, 5, black	Carl E. Bailey
James Charles Jr.	Black	24	January 19, 1940	Pulaski	Murder-Robbery	Fred Angeles, 57, white	Carl E. Bailey
Otis Manning	Black	27	April 12, 1940	Union	Murder	Jimmy Warren, white	Carl E. Bailey
Jack Gulley	Black	26	November 15, 1940	Nevada	Murder-Robbery	Orville Cox, 22, white	Carl E. Bailey
James Dillard	Black	35	December 13, 1940	Desha	Murder	Joseph Hill Breedlove, 62, white (constable)	Carl E. Bailey
John Mooney	Black	21	January 24, 1941	Woodruff	Murder-Rape	Ruby Montgomery, white	Homer Martin Adkins
A. C. Payton	Black	41	May 15, 1941	Crittenden	Murder	Lillie Mae Hill, black (step-daughter)	Homer Martin Adkins
Percy Lewis	Black	30	June 6, 1941	Phillips	Murder	W. H. Patton, white	Homer Martin Adkins
John Henry Riney	Black	25	June 20, 1941	Desha	Rape	Female, white	Homer Martin Adkins
John Washington	Black	33	October 11, 1941	White	Murder	Mrs. Raymond Rongey, 17, white	Homer Martin Adkins
Jimmie Herron	Black		January 23, 1942	Little River	Murder		Homer Martin Adkins
Ben Adams	White	47	June 5, 1942	Woodruff	Murder-Robbery	Arthur Bowie, white	Homer Martin Adkins
A. T. Jones	Black		July 31, 1942	Phillips	Murder	George Miller, black	Homer Martin Adkins
Stoney Allison	Black	19	November 20, 1942	Desha	Rape	Annie Benson, white	Homer Martin Adkins
A. D. Luckyado	Black	34	November 20, 1942	Lonoke	Murder	Thomas Lafayette Taylor, 52, white	Homer Martin Adkins
Adolph Thomas	Black	40	March 19, 1943	Columbia	Murder	Levi Young, black	Homer Martin Adkins
Henry Thompson	Black	44	August 6, 1943	Cleveland	Murder-Robbery	Mrs. Henry Vetito, 42, white	Homer Martin Adkins
Seke Mack	Black	40	June 2, 1944	Mississippi	Murder		Homer Martin Adkins
Walker Hudson	Black	53	July 7, 1944	Clark	Murder	Janie Hudson, black (wife)	Homer Martin Adkins
Jim Tacker	White	61	July 14, 1944	Crittenden	Murder	Eskar Patterson, white	Homer Martin Adkins
Levi Clingham	Black	44	December 1, 1944	Crittenden	Murder	Roy Curtis, white (deputy sheriff)	Homer Martin Adkins
Tony Brown	Black	39	March 30, 1945	Mississippi	Murder	A. M. Lynch, white	Benjamin T. Laney
James Yates	Black	21	May 25, 1945	Arkansas	Murder	Naloy L. Browning, white	Benjamin T. Laney
James Waybern Hall	White	24	January 4, 1946	Pulaski	Murder-Robbery	Fayrene Clemmons Hall, 19, white (wife) (Note: Also committed four other murders.)	Benjamin T. Laney
Willie Riley	Black	32	April 12, 1946	Chicot	Murder	Claude Towns, black	Benjamin T. Laney
Elton Chitwood	White	25	November 22, 1946	Polk	Murder-Robbery	Raymond Morris, 40, white	Benjamin T. Laney
Andrew Thomas	Black	23	November 29, 1946	Jefferson	Murder	Mary Liza Green, 37, black (mother-in-law)	Benjamin T. Laney
Clifton Holmes	Black	26	January 10, 1947	Jefferson	Rape	Female, 13, white	Benjamin T. Laney
Albert Hodges	Black	34	January 17, 1947	Pulaski	Rape	Female, white	Benjamin T. Laney
Jeff Henley Jr.	Black	20	January 24, 1947	Lee	Murder	Mabel Williams, 20, black (wife)	Benjamin T. Laney
Vollie Bill Bates	White	20	May 16, 1947	Polk	Murder	Thomas Lee Dugan, white	Benjamin T. Laney
Lawrence W. Dukes	Black	40	August 8, 1947	St. Francis	Murder-Rape	Mrs. Frank Boyd, 35, white	Benjamin T. Laney
Cubie Lee Johnson	Black	24	August 8, 1947	Pulaski	Murder-Robbery	Henry Williams, black	Benjamin T. Laney
James H. Hyde	White	26	February 13, 1948	Carroll	Murder	Frank Simpson, white	Benjamin T. Laney
Edmond Pugh	Black	20	July 2, 1948	Pulaski	Rape	Female, 2, black (Note: Also attempted to rape two black women.)	Benjamin T. Laney
Mizell Palmer	Black	25	July 17, 1949	Pulaski	Rape	Female, white	Sid McMath
Harvie Rorie	White	45	July 22, 1949	Jefferson	Murder	Three people, white (Note: 39-year-old estranged wife Gertrude Rorie and her two children, 11-year-old Frankie Maupin and 9-year-old Joyce Maupin.)	Sid McMath
Walter Pierce	Black	21	December 9, 1949	Chicot	Murder-Rape	Sarah Jackson, 66, black	Sid McMath
Wesley Hildreth	Black	26	December 23, 1949	Phillips (Note: Change of venue from Lee County.)	Rape	Female, 21, white	Sid McMath
Thomas Black	White	28	March 10, 1950	Pulaski	Murder-Rape	Betty Jane McCall, 22, white (Note: Serial rapist, previously attacked multiple other women but none came forward to avoid publicity.)	Sid McMath
Hollis Needham	White	26	March 17, 1950	Mississippi	Rape-Kidnap	Female, 8, white	Sid McMath
Robert L. Smith	White	41	April 24, 1950	Pulaski	Murder	Sallie Mae Barner, white (ex-wife) (Note: Smith, a bigamist, married Barner without divorcing his previous wife, and she annulled their marriage after discovering this.)	Sid McMath
George Ferguson	Black	35	February 23, 1951	Pulaski	Murder	Durward Miller, 41, white	Sid McMath
Matthew Ezell	Black	38	February 23, 1951	Mississippi	Murder	Ernestine Harris, 8, black (Note: Murdered during rape attempt.)	Sid McMath
Aubrey Smith	Black	30	July 27, 1951	Phillips (Note: Change of venue from St. Francis County.)	Murder	Ray Campbell, white (deputy sheriff)	Sid McMath
Arthur Grays	Black	21	November 23, 1951	Mississippi	Murder-Robbery	Homer Tucker, white	Sid McMath
Peter Dorsey	Black	27	November 23, 1951	Phillips (Note: Change of venue from St. Francis County.)	Murder	Ray Campbell, white (deputy sheriff)	Sid McMath
Herman Maxwell	Black	22	June 6, 1952	Hempstead	Rape	Female, white	Sid McMath
Wilson Wright	Black	19	August 1, 1952	Dallas	Murder	Allen Green Roberts, white (Note: Attempted to rape Roberts' niece, Mrs. Irene Holloway, in an abandoned house shortly before his murder.)	Sid McMath
Bill Jenkins	Native American	50	May 7, 1954	Garland	Murder	Cleo Jones, 16, white	Francis Cherry
Leo Scarber	Black	60	September 21, 1956	Nevada	Rape	Female, 76, white	Orval Faubus
Lawrence Smith	Black	19	July 24, 1959	Chicot	Murder	Gary C. Cundiff, white	Orval Faubus
Leo Lee	Black	56	September 25, 1959	Pulaski	Murder	William H. Smith Jr., 25, black (Note: Serial rapist, raped Smith's 19-year-old girlfriend after killing him and later attacked two other couples in Gillam Park.)	Orval Faubus
William Young	Black	39	October 2, 1959	Mississippi	Murder	Erman Cox, white (state patrolman)	Orval Faubus
Thomas Walker	Black	52	October 2, 1959	Crittenden	Murder	J. W. Orman, white	Orval Faubus
J. T. House	Black	25	October 23, 1959	Phillips	Murder	Ernestine Coley, 19, black	Orval Faubus
Arthur Hayes	Black	44	October 23, 1959	Mississippi	Murder	Justus Edrington, white	Orval Faubus
James Moore	Black	22	May 13, 1960	Miller	Murder-Robbery	M. R. Hamm, 76, white	Orval Faubus
Roger Boone	Black	28	May 13, 1960	Miller	Murder-Robbery	M. R. Hamm, 76, white	Orval Faubus
Willie Byrd	Black	23	May 20, 1960	Miller	Murder-Robbery	M. R. Hamm, 76, white	Orval Faubus
James Boyd	Black	22	May 20, 1960	Miller	Murder-Robbery	M. R. Hamm, 76, white	Orval Faubus
William Nail	White	27	September 16, 1960	Jefferson	Murder	James Leroy Montgomery, white (inmate) (Note: Both trustees at Tucker Prison Farm.)	Orval Faubus
Emmett Leggett	White	23	September 16, 1960	Pulaski	Murder	Joe King, 14, white (Note: Serial rapist, convicted of two other attempted rapes and attempted to sexually assault King before murdering him. Also killed another victim after raping her and her sister shortly after King's murder.)	Orval Faubus
Lawrence Moore	Black	21	October 28, 1960	Crittenden	Murder-Robbery	Ross Nichols, 69, white	Orval Faubus
John Bracey	Black	27	October 28, 1960	Chicot	Murder-Robbery	Alberta Miles, 76, white	Orval Faubus
Charles F. Fields	White	32	January 24, 1964	Jefferson	Rape-Burglary	Myrtle Lee Taylor, 32, white (Note: Serial rapist, escaped from Tucker Prison Farm where he was a prison trusty and already serving a life sentence for the rape of a 23-year-old white woman. Also robbed and murdered Charlie Andrew Mencer (50, white), but was never tried for this crime.)	Orval Faubus

== See also ==
- Capital punishment in Arkansas
- Crime in Arkansas
