= Lester Brockelhurst =

Executed American serial killer

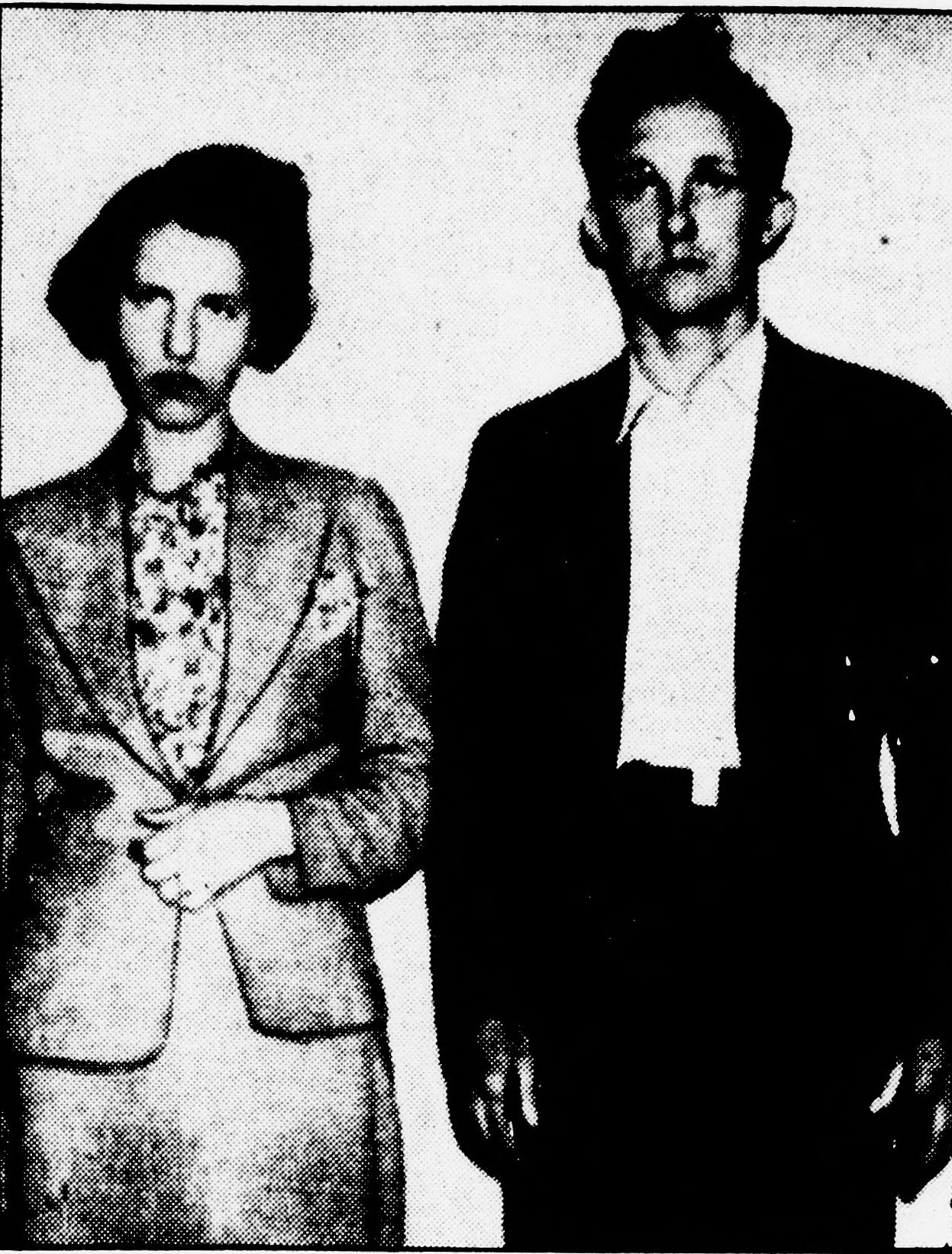
- Press photograph of Felton (left) and Brockelhurst (right)
- Born: Lester Warfel Brockelhurst, Jr. January 4, 1914; Peoria, Illinois, U.S.
- Died: March 18, 1938 (aged 24); Tucker Unit, Tucker, Arkansas, U.S.
- Cause of death: Execution by electrocution
- Other names: "The Crime Tourist"; "The Touring Slayer"
- Conviction: First degree murder
- Penalty: Death

Details
- Victims: 3+
- Span of crimes: March – May 1937
- Country: United States
- States: Illinois; Texas; Arkansas
- Date apprehended: May 13, 1937

Lester Warfel Brockelhurst Jr. (January 4, 1914 – March 18, 1938), known as The Crime Tourist, was an American murderer who, together with his girlfriend Bernice Felton, killed at least three men in holdups during a six-week crime spree across multiple states in 1937. Found guilty of the final murder, Brockelhurst was executed at the Tucker Unit the following year.

== Early life ==
Lester Jr. was born in Peoria, Illinois, the first son of Mormon couple Lester Warfel Brockelhurst Sr. and his wife Edyth (née DuPree). Another son, Karl, was born in 1930, and Lester also had a sister named Fern Irene. Six months after Lester's birth, his family moved to Galesburg, Illinois, where they stayed until moving to Dallas, Texas, in 1926. Lester's father started an interior decorating business while the family was in Dallas. Lester attended grade school in Dallas before moving back to Illinois with his parents and sister, this time settling in the village of Maquon, Illinois, which is located near Galesburg. He graduated from Maquon High School; after completing his schooling, he went to work at his father's painting and decorating business, which was relocated from Dallas.

For some time in Galesburg, Brockelhurst was the president of the Mormon church's Young Men's Mutual Improvement Association; he was also a Sunday school teacher. While in high school, Brockelhurst gained experience in drama and public speaking. He could not participate in athletics due to having received an injury while trying to pole vault.

Brockelhurst met Bernice Felton (then 16 years old) at a public speaking contest in Illinois. She was a fellow competitor in the contest. The two got to know each other over a period of time and fell in love, but their homes were 165 miles apart, so Brockelhurst could not visit her as frequently as he wished. He visited her every two weeks and wrote to her in between.

In January 1935, Brockelhurst and his father argued about money. The argument resulted in Brockelhurst leaving home and hitchhiking to Chicago, where he held up a candy shop. He was quickly arrested and convicted of armed robbery and sentenced to a two-year prison sentence at the Joliet State Penitentiary on February 11, 1935, although a few weeks into his sentence, he was transferred to the Illinois State Reformatory in Pontiac, Illinois. Bernice kept in touch with Brockelhurst through writing as he served his sentence. Her father advocated on his behalf, resulting in his parole on March 7, 1936, just over a year into his sentence. He was paroled into the custody of Felton's father and started working in a nearby department store and print shop. He expressed a desire to take her to Salt Lake City's Mormon Temple to marry Felton there, but he did not have the money to support Felton or make the trip. As a result, on March 31, 1937, the couple embarked on a 18-statewide crime spree, motivated by robbery.

== Murders and capture ==
On the same day as their sudden disappearance from the city, a 47-year-old local tailor named John Albin Theander disappeared along with his car. Some time later, his body was found on the outskirts of Rockford, with a single bullet hole in his head. After killing him, Brockelhurst and Felton travelled to Salt Lake City and then onto Dallas, before winding up in Fort Worth on April 28. There, they held up a tavern owned by a man named Jack Griffith, who attempted to defend his property from the two criminals. In response, Lester shot and killed him on the spot, and the couple fled the state. Their next destination was Little Rock, Arkansas, and on May 6, they ditched Theander's car and travelled to Memphis, Tennessee on foot. There, they were picked up by Victor A. Gates, a wealthy landowner who resided in Little Rock, who drove them there. When they reached Arkansas, Brockelhurst shot Gates in the head, robbed him of his money and valuables and then threw the body into a ditch.

From this point onward, the couple wandered around the country, committing about 40 robberies and hold-ups, but no other known murders were recorded. After robbing a bakery in Philadelphia, Brockelhurst and Felton arrived in Dutchess County, New York. On May 13, a state trooper named Joseph Hunt noted that their car was missing a license plate and stopped them. When he noticed that there was a loaded revolver in the car, he took the couple to Fishkill for further interrogation. Not long after his arrest, Brockelhurst admitted to being the outlaw who had been robbing various establishments in the past weeks, and additionally confessed to the three murders. The contemporary press likened the arrest to that of bank robber Merle Vandenbush, who had been arrested at nearby Katonah for a minor traffic violation.

Two days after his capture, a nervous Brockelhurst was detained in Poughkeepsie as officials from Illinois, Texas, Arkansas, New York and the Federal government were discussing on which jurisdiction would house and subsequently charge the accused with murder. Due to his frequent faintings, he had to be sedated by jail physician George E. Lane, who told the press that his behavior was caused by "overexcitement". While incarcerated at his jail cell, Sheriff Paul Johnson of the Rockford Police Department travelled to Poughkeepsie so he could interview Lester about his possible involvement in the murder of gas station operator Herman Luhrsen on February 12, in the small town of Rockton, which was located not far from Rockford. According to Johnson, Luhrsen had been murdered with the same type of gun used by Brockelhurst.

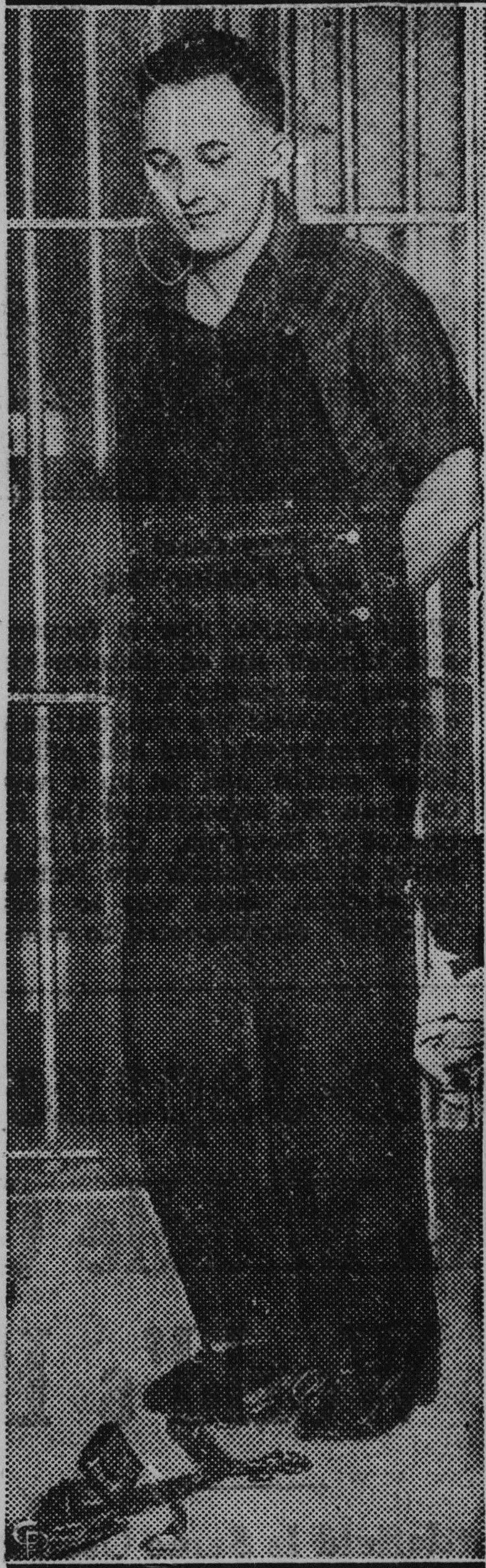
Brockelhurst on death row

In the end, a decision by New York's then-governor, Herbert H. Lehman, concluded that Brockelhurst should be extradited to Arkansas and handed over to prosecutor George Hartje, reasoning that they had the strongest case against the killer. Brockelhurst had no objections over this, as he "wanted to get it over with" and was assured that in any case he would end up in the electric chair. Prosecutor Hartje publicly stated that he would demand death sentences for both Brockelhurst and Felton, which prompted Abraham Felton, Bernice's father, to tell the press that his daughter had allegedly been told a sob story from Lester about how his parole officers were "hounding him" until he got married, and so, to get rid of them, he took her so they could get married.

== Trial, sentence and execution ==
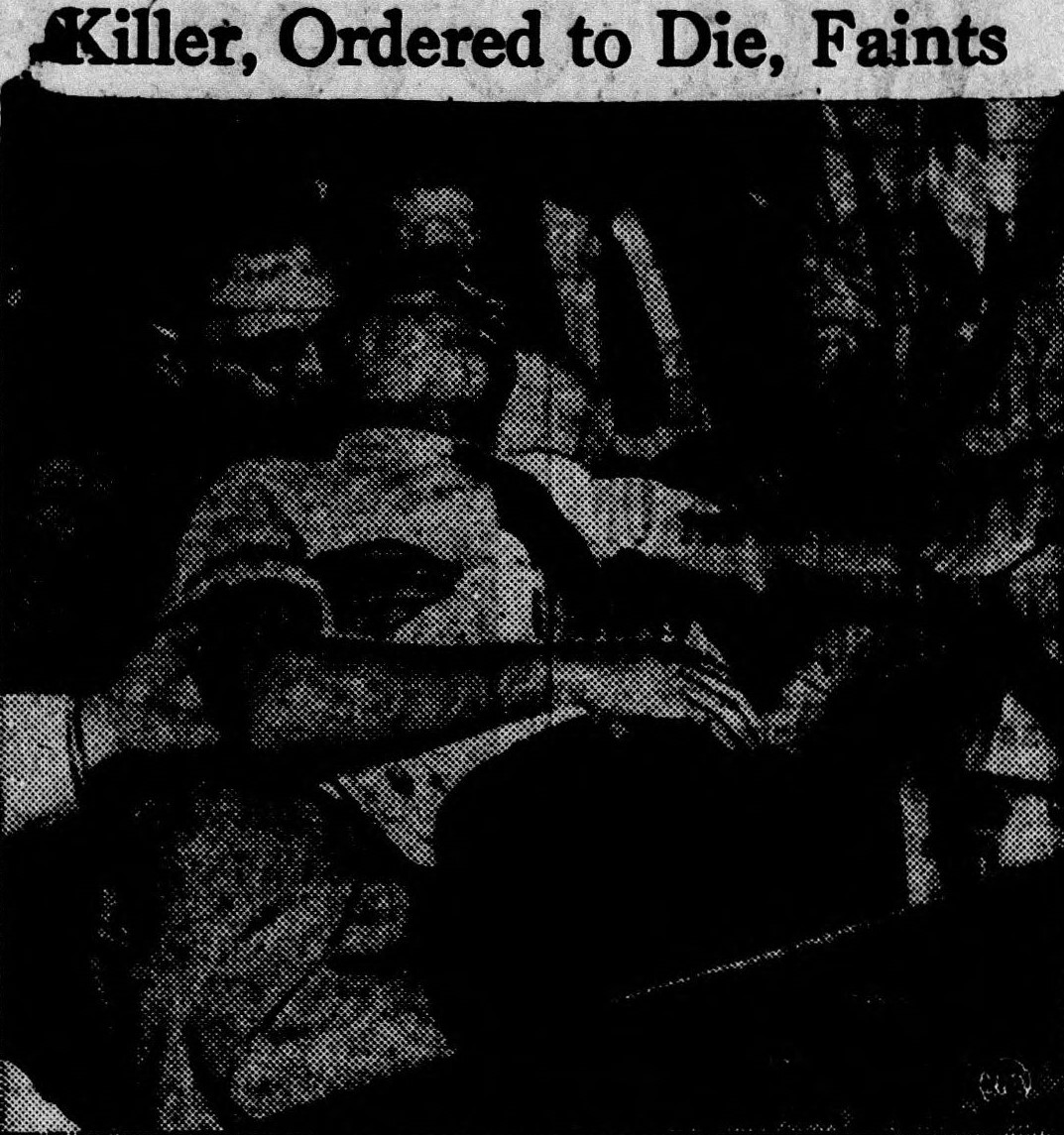
Lester Brockelhurst, unconscious, following the announcement of the verdict

The pair's trial was scheduled for June 14, and was to take place in Lonoke, Arkansas. During this time, both Lester and Bernice were kept under suicide watch, as both had declared that if one of them took their life, the other would do the same. They were kept in separate cells, but were still allowed to share meals together under the prison guard's supervision. Twenty days before the trial was due to start, Brockelhurst's attorneys notified the Circuit Judge W. J. Waggoner that they would petition the Supreme Court to stop the trial, after their previous request for a 30-day continuance had been denied. On the eve of the trial, Lester and Bernice had a quarrel, and as a result, she was allowed to be present as a state witness against her former partner. Brockelhurst's attorneys' defense was based around the claim that their client was insane, but the prosecution countered their claims with an affidavit from the State Hospital for Nervous Diseases, which, upon examination, determined that the defendant was completely sane.

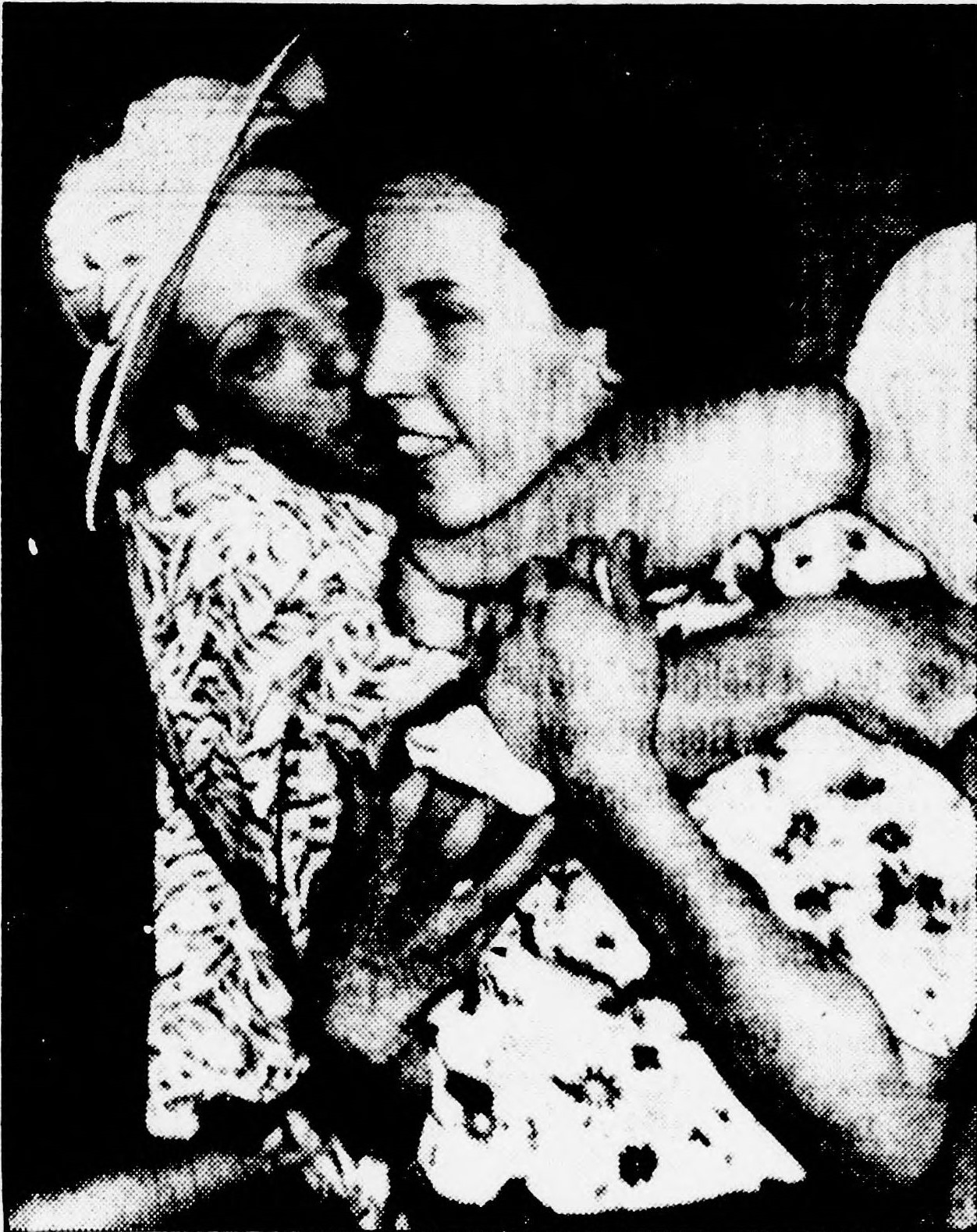
Bernice Felton following her acquittal

At the end of the trial, Lester Brockelhurst was found guilty of killing Victor Gates and sentenced to die in the electric chair. Upon hearing the verdict, he fainted and had to be carried to his cell while unconscious. His father, who was also present, also collapsed. The following day, Bernice Felton was also put on trial for the murder of Gates. Much to the public's dismay, after deliberating for only 80 minutes, Felton was acquitted of the murder charge and set free. She and her father were transported to stay the night at a tourist camp, as the locals were likely to attack them if they were seen on the streets.

While spared a murder conviction, Felton faced additional federal charges for transporting the stolen car of one Lester's victim across state lines, from Arkansas to Tennessee. She was found guilty, and after the judge harshly admonished the jury that had acquitted her of murder, he sentenced her to the maximum term allowed for the charge, five years in prison. After her release, she married in 1948 and had a son in Baltimore in 1949; he died at age 16 in an automobile accident. After that marriage ended, she married again and became the mother of eight more children, but that marriage, too, ended in the early 1960s. Bernice herself lived until age 88, dying in 2007. She was buried at Rockford, Illinois.

Over the following months, an appeal was lodged to the Supreme Court for the commutation of Brockelhurst's sentence, but on November 30, it was promptly shot down. Upon hearing of the decision, Lester received the news calmly, saying that nothing he could say would help him. While awaiting his execution at the Tucker Unit, Brockelhurst was interviewed about yet another murder, that of an unidentified man found dead in Poughkeepsie around the time that the pair were seen in the area.

On March 2, 1938, Brockelhurst's attorneys presented a petition, signed by two Little Rock doctors and more than 50 Galesburg residents, which claimed that Lester was mentally ill, and thus, ineligible for execution. Despite their last-ditch attempt, the Jefferson Circuit Court threw out the petition, thus confirming the death verdict for the final time. On March 18, Lester Brockelhurst was electrocuted at the Tucker Unit. Before being strapped to the chair, he gave a 12-minute statement, ending it with a rant about his affair with Bernice. His last words were reportedly the following:

"The only thing that brought me down to this was a slight love affair with a girl. I don't want her to get the chair, but she is just as guilty as I."

== See also ==
- Capital punishment in Arkansas
- List of people executed in Arkansas (pre-1972)
- List of people executed in the United States in 1938
- List of people executed by electrocution
