= Charles Hudspeth (convict) =

American man executed for murder

- Died: December 30, 1892; Harrison, Arkansas, U.S.
- Other name: Andrew J. "Andy" Hudspeth
- Known for: Executed for murder, then falsely proclaimed as innocent when it was falsely claimed that his victim had been found alive
- Status: Executed by hanging
- Conviction: First degree murder
- Penalty: Death

Charles Hudspeth (a.k.a. Andrew J. "Andy" Hudspeth) was an American man convicted of murder in Marion County, Arkansas, in 1887. On December 30, 1892, he was executed for the murder of his lover's husband. His victim was purportedly later found to be alive, albeit this story was subsequently found to be a hoax. Nevertheless, Hudspeth is often falsely proclaimed to have been wrongfully executed.

George Watkins and his wife, Rebecca, moved in 1886 from Kansas to Marion County, Arkansas, where Rebecca apparently soon became intimately involved with Charles Hudspeth. The following year, Watkins disappeared.

Rebecca and Hudspeth were arrested and, after lengthy interrogation, Rebecca allegedly made a statement accusing Hudspeth of murdering Watkins to get him out of the way so they could be married. She was charged as an accessory to murder and died in custody while awaiting trial in 1888. Based on Rebecca's testimony, Hudspeth was convicted and sentenced to death, but the Arkansas Supreme Court set aside the conviction on the ground that the trial judge, R. H. Powell, had improperly barred testimony regarding Rebecca's alleged lack of good character.

While awaiting his second trial, Hudspeth escaped from jail. He went on the run for 8 months before being recaptured. Upon retrial, Hudspeth was again convicted and again sentenced to death. He was hanged at Harrison, Arkansas, on December 30, 1892. In June 1893, Hudspeth's lawyer, W. F. Pace, allegedly located Watkins alive and well in Kansas. However, this story was later found to be a hoax. The judge said he would be willing to wager any money that Watkins was dead. It was also reported that Hudspeth had been convicted mainly because he had been in the possession of Watkin's money, coat, gloves, and pipe.

== See also ==
- Capital punishment in Arkansas
- List of people executed in Arkansas (pre-1972)
- List of murder convictions without a body
