= Elijah Wood (murderer) =

American murderer (1878–1913)

- Born: Elijah Green Wood; 1878; Arkansas, U.S.
- Died: July 14, 1913 (aged 35); Pulaski County Jail, Little Rock, Arkansas, U.S.
- Cause of death: Execution by hanging
- Other names: Elijah Greenwood; Elijah Green Woods
- Conviction: First degree murder
- Penalty: Death

Details
- Victims: 1–4
- Span of crimes: 1910–1912
- Country: United States
- State: Arkansas
- Date apprehended: December 3, 1912

Elijah Green Wood (1878 – July 14, 1913) was an American murderer and accused serial killer. Convicted, sentenced to death and executed for killing a woman in Little Rock, Arkansas in 1912, he was posthumously accused by another death row inmate for three additional murders committed in 1910. Due to the fact he was already dead, Wood was never prosecuted for them and the three murders officially remain unsolved.

== Murder of Alice Turner ==
On November 28, 1912, a black woman named Alice Turner was shot and killed near the Frazier Pike in Little Rock in an apparent robbery. Initially, police arrested preacher W. A. Pearson on suspicion of being the killer, as it was determined that his shotgun had been used in the murder - however, Pearson convinced the authorities that it had been stolen from him and was then released. On December 3, Wood, a laborer who worked at a nearby sawmill, was arrested for the murder after officers concluded that he had sold the murder weapon at a pawn shop. His wife Sarah was briefly detained on suspicion of harboring a fugitive, but was released after she promised to help the officers locate the stolen money.

After extensive questioning, Wood confessed that he had killed Turner because he wanted to steal a $10 bill she had shown to him, and that he had stolen $75 after killing her. He claimed that he alone was responsible, and that his brother James – who had been arrested as an accomplice – had nothing to do with the case. As a result of this confession, James Wood was released, while Elijah was charged with first-degree murder and ordered to stand trial on January 9, 1913.

== Trial and execution ==
Soon after his trial began, Wood recanted his confession and claimed that he had nothing to do with Turner's murder. His claims were not believed, and he was swiftly tried, convicted and sentenced to death. All of his appeals were denied, and he was scheduled to be hanged on July 14, 1913.

In the final days leading up to his execution, Wood gradually resigned to his fate and said that he was ready to die, although he still protested his innocence. He spent most of his time either by himself, chatting with friend and fellow death row inmate Hugh Alvin "Boss" Gaylord or talking to his spiritual advisers. On the aforementioned execution date, Wood was hanged at the Pulaski County Jail in Little Rock. His last meal consisted of chicken, ice cream, cake, cantaloupe and a bottle of beer, described by the media as a "feast".

His execution was considered controversial by opponents of the death penalty, some of whom contended that Wood was not the one who shot Turner. In an article written in the Batesville Daily Guard, an anonymous writer declared his belief that Pearson had supposedly confessed in private that he had fired the fatal shot, not Wood. While the author stated he did not believe Wood was fully innocent, he suggested that he was likely a mere accomplice present at the crime scene.

== Accusations from Boss Gaylord ==
Shortly prior to his own execution, Wood's cellmate and friend "Boss" Gaylord supposedly told the jailers that Wood had confided to him that he had killed three other people aside from Alice Turner. According to him, Wood had confessed to the murders of Clara Diehl and Arthur Hatton, who were gunned down by an unknown assailant near Sweet Home on September 19, 1910. He had supposedly been paid to kill somebody else, but had mistaken Hatton for his target and killed him instead, with Wood deciding to kill Diehl as well in order to avoid having any witnesses. The third murder he had supposedly confessed was that of local merchant and farmer Yancey Mashburn, who had been shot and killed near Little Rock on October 7, 1910, during a botched robbery.

Since Wood had already been executed and thus could not stand trial for these crimes, Gaylord's claims could not be definitely proven and the aforementioned murders officially remain unsolved.

== See also ==
- Capital punishment in Arkansas
- List of people executed in Arkansas (pre-1972)
