= Hutto v. Finney =

- Supreme Court of the United States

Argued February 21, 1978 Decided June 23, 1978
- Full case name: Terrell Don Hutto, et al. v. Robert Finney, et al.
- Docket no.: 76-1660
- Citations: 437 U.S. 678 (more) 98 S. Ct. 2565; 57 L. Ed. 2d 522
- Argument: Oral argument
- Opinion announcement: Opinion announcement

Case history
- Prior: Finney v. Hutto, 410 F. Supp. 251 (E.D. Ark. 1976); Finney v. Hutto, 548 F.2d 740 (8th Cir. 1977); Certiorari granted, 434 U.S. 901 (1977)

Holding
- Upheld a number of limitations placed on the Arkansas Department of Corrections including a limit of punitive isolation to 30 days, a limit on the number of men in each cell, a requirement that each man have a bunk, and the discontinuation of a non-nutritious "grue" diet. Ignoring these limitations would constitute cruel and unusual punishment.

Court membership
- Chief Justice Warren E. Burger Associate Justices William J. Brennan Jr. · Potter Stewart; Byron White · Thurgood Marshall; Harry Blackmun · Lewis F. Powell Jr. William Rehnquist · John P. Stevens

Case opinions
- Majority: Stevens, joined by Brennan, Stewart, Marshall, Blackmun; White (Part I); Burger, Powell (Parts I and II-A)
- Concurrence: Brennan
- Concur/dissent: Powell, joined by Burger; White, Rehnquist (dissent)
- Dissent: Rehnquist, joined by White

Hutto v. Finney, 437 U.S. 678 (1978), is a landmark U.S. Supreme Court case against the Arkansas Department of Correction. The litigation lasted almost a decade, from 1969 through 1978. It was the first successful lawsuit filed by an inmate against a correctional institution. The case also clarified the Arkansas prison system's unacceptable punitive measures. Hutto v. Finney was a certiorari to the United States Court of Appeals for the Eighth Circuit.

== Background ==
In their 1998 book Policy Making and the Modern State: How the Courts Reformed America, Malcolm M. Feeley and Edward L. Rubin traced the history of prison reform in Arkansas to 1965 and the case of Talley v. Stephens (Note: The superintendent at Cummins was Dan D. Stephens.) 247 F. Supp. 683 (1965), a pro se petition for a writ of habeas corpus filed in the U.S. District Court for the Eastern District of Arkansas on behalf of prisoners at Cummins prison, located along the Arkansas River, 75 miles southeast of Little Rock, in Lincoln County, Arkansas. The presiding judge was Judge J. Smith Henley, who was familiar with "the long series of scandals involving the Arkansas prison system". Feeley and Rubin described Cummins prison farm in the mid-1960s, "on the eve of events that were to transform it and initiate the judicial prison reform process" where "trusty guards", "reliable" armed prisoners−hardened felons themselves−on foot and on horseback, supervised long lines of prisoners who were working in the vast fields "six days a week, ten hours a day". Prisoners also worked as house servants in the plantation homes of Cummins officers. Concerned about a "federal court takeover" similar to the federal response after then-Arkansas Governor Orval Faubus deployed the Arkansas National Guard to Little Rock Central High School on September 4, 1957 to prevent desegregation, Arkansas' prison officials improved some of the conditions for prisoners.

On February 18, 1970, Judge J. Smith Henley wrote that, "For the ordinary convict a sentence to the Arkansas Penitentiary... amounts to a banishment from civilized society to a dark and evil world completely alien to the free world, a world that is administered by criminals under unwritten rules and customs completely foreign to free world culture."

According to a 1971 article published in The University of Chicago Law Review, in Holt v. Sarver (1969) (300 U.S. 825 (1969)), Judge J. Smith Henley ruled that the "entire Arkansas penitentiary system prison, as then operated, constituted cruel and unusual punishment" and that some aspects of the system were unconstitutional and ordered administrators to implement changes and report on progress towards implementation.

According to an October 1978 article in the American Bar Association Journal, the ten-year long litigation against the Arkansas Department of Correction in Supreme Court Hutto v. Finney 437 U.S. 678 (1978) began in 1969. SCOTUS determined that the Eighth Amendment to the United States Constitution prohibited the practice of using punitive isolation for more than 30 days.

Defense attorneys for the prisoners, Philip E. Kaplan and Jack Holt Jr., began their work in December 1969 with the first litigation challenging conditions in the Arkansas prison system.

This case involved a challenge to the practice of "punitive isolation" in Arkansas prisons which was often done for indiscriminate periods of time in crowded windowless cells. Kaplan and Holt Jr. also defended the prisoners in Holt v. Sarver.

In his 2007 paper published in the University of Pennsylvania Journal of Constitutional Law, professor Seth F. Kreimer traced the history of court decisions prior to Hutto v. Finney, in relation to what constitutes "cruel and unusual punishment" in prison systems, in terms of violating the Eighth Amendment. Jackson v. Bishop 404 F.2d 571 (8th Cir. 1968), in which then-judge Harry Blackmun abolished corporal punishment in Arkansas' penitentiary system, "constituted a leading precedent in the application of the recently-incorporated Eighth Amendment to prison practices."

== Procedural history ==
Hutto v. Finney (1978) was the first successful lawsuit filed by an inmate against a correctional institution. The case also clarified the Arkansas prison system's unacceptable punitive measures.

During the trial, the prisoners' living conditions were scrutinized.

By June 23, 1978, as part of the Finney v. Hutto series, there "had been three published district court opinions, five additional unpublished interim memoranda and orders of the district court, and three opinions in the appeals court regarding the Arkansas Department of Correction and the administration of the Arkansas prison system. All of the findings of unconstitutionality of the Arkansas prison system as cruel and unusual punishment by the district court had either been affirmed or never challenged".

== Amicus briefs ==
The American Civil Liberties Union (ACLU) and others filed amicus briefs "urging affirmance" in support of the Respondent. Over a dozen attorneys general and assistant attorneys general, from across the country filed briefs for the Petitioner.

== Counsel of Record ==
Garner L. Taylor Jr., Assistant Attorney General of Arkansas, was the Chief Lawyer for the Petitioners with then-Arkansas Attorney General, Bill Clinton, and Robert Alston Newcomb also on the brief. The Chief Lawyer for the Respondents was Philip E. Kaplan, with Jack Holt Jr. and seven other attorneys.

== Decision ==
The Supreme Court handed down its decision in Hutto v. Finney on June 23, 1978. They called for a limit on the amount of time prisoners spent in solitary confinement. The Court fined the Department of Correction $20,000 because of the reluctance of prison officials to remedy the unconstitutional prison conditions in Arkansas.

== Culture ==
In 2011, the Old State House Museum hosted an award-winning exhibition, curated by Brian Robertson, Tony Perrin, and Bobby Roberts, entitled, Badges, Bandits & Bars: Arkansas Law and Justice exploring Arkansas' "history of crime and punishment from pre-territorial days to the mid-1980s". "Behind Bars" dealt with "Arizona's seemingly endless quest to reform its prison system".

== See also ==
- Trusty system
- Gates v. Collier
- Pervear v. Massachusetts
- Weems v. United States, 217 U.S. 349 (1910).
- Estelle v. Gamble, 429 U.S. 97 (1976).
- Nutraloaf
