= Holt v. Sarver =

- Court: United States District Court for the Eastern District of Arkansas
- Full case name: Holt v. Sarver
- Decided: 1969 (Holt I), 1970 (Holt II), 1971 (Injunction)
- Citations: 300 F. Supp. 825 (E.D. Ark. 1969), 309 F. Supp. 362 (E.D. Ark. 1970)

Case history
- Prior actions: Jones v. Cunningham (1963), Pervear v. Massachusetts (1866)
- Subsequent actions: Gates v. Collier and subsequent prison reform litigation

Court membership
- Judge sitting: Judge J. Smith Henley

Case opinions
- Decision by: Judge J. Smith Henley

Keywords
- Prison conditions; Eighth Amendment; Cruel and unusual punishment; Prisoners' rights; Arkansas prison system; Habeas corpus

Holt v. Sarver was a court decision that was the first in a series of American common law cases that have found entire state prison systems in violation of prisoners' constitutional rights by inflicting cruel and unusual punishment.

The United States District Court for the Eastern District of Arkansas ruled that the Arkansas prison system, which at the time had no written standards, violated the US Constitution. The cases significantly altered the American prison system, specifically with regard to prisoners' rights under the Eighth Amendment.

== Arkansas cases ==
In 1969 in Holt v. Sarver I, 300 F. Supp. 825 (E.D. Ark.), Judge J. Smith Henley ruled several aspects of Arkansas' existing prison system unconstitutional. He issued guidelines to follow for correcting the problems, and ordered administrators to report on the progress of the implementation of these guidelines.

In 1970 in Holt v. Sarver II, 309 F. Supp. 362 (E.D. Ark.), Judge Henley ruled the entire Arkansas prison system unconstitutional and ordered the State Correction Board to devise a plan of action. In that same case in 1971, Judge Henley enjoined the Arkansas prison from preventing the inmates' access to court and from inflicting cruel and unusual punishment upon them.

One of the attorneys representing the inmates, Jack Holt Jr., eventually became chief justice of the Arkansas Supreme Court. The cases inspired the 1980 film, Brubaker, depicting mistreatment and malfeasance in prison management in Arkansas.

== Prior history ==
The Supreme Court ruled in Jones v. Cunningham in 1963 that inmates in state institutions could file a writ of habeas corpus challenging the conditions of their imprisonment as well as its legality. This ruling reversed the Supreme Court's "hands off" policy regarding federal interference in state penal issues first clearly stated in 1866 in Pervear v. Massachusetts. Subsequently, in a series of cases starting with Gates v. Collier the federal government began whole scale intervention in the constitutionality of the operation of state prison systems.

== See also ==
- Trusty system
- Gates v. Collier
- Pervear v. Massachusetts
