= Barr v. City of Columbia =

- Supreme Court of the United States

Argued October 14–15, 1963 Decided June 22, 1964
- Full case name: Charles F. Barr, et al. v. City of Columbia
- Citations: 378 U.S. 146 (more) 84 S. Ct. 1734; 12 L. Ed. 2d 766; 1964 U.S. LEXIS 820

Case history
- Prior: Conviction affirmed, 239 S.C. 395, 123 S.E.2d 521, cert. granted, 374 U.S. 804 (1963).

Holding
- The state breach of the peace convictions could not stand as there was no evidence to support them, and the criminal trespass convictions were reversed for the reasons stated in Bouie v. City of Columbia.

Court membership
- Chief Justice Earl Warren Associate Justices Hugo Black · William O. Douglas; Tom C. Clark · John M. Harlan II; William J. Brennan Jr. · Potter Stewart; Byron White · Arthur Goldberg

Case opinions
- Majority: Black, joined by unanimous
- Concurrence: Douglas
- Concurrence: Goldberg, joined by Warren

Laws applied
- US Const. amend. XIV

Barr v. City of Columbia, 378 U.S. 146 (1964), is a United States Supreme Court decision that reversed the breach of peace and criminal trespass convictions of five African Americans who were refused service at a lunch counter of a department store. The Court held that there was insufficient evidence to support the breach of peace convictions, and reversed the criminal trespass convictions for the reasons stated in another case that was decided that same day, Bouie v. City of Columbia, which held that the retroactive application of an expanded construction of a criminal statute was barred by due process of ex post facto laws.

== Background ==
Five African American students from Benedict College went to the Taylor Street Pharmacy in Columbia, South Carolina, and sat down at its lunch counter and waited for service. The store allowed persons of all races to use all facilities except for the lunch counter, which served whites only. The store manager had arranged for police to be present for any sit-in demonstrators, and then, consistent with the restaurant's policy of refusing service to blacks, the restaurant manager requested the persons to leave. When they refused, they were arrested for breach of the peace and criminal trespass. At trial the defendants their arrest, prosecution, and conviction by the state for requesting service at a restaurant that refused service to African Americans would violate the Due Process and Equal Protection Clauses of the Fourteenth Amendment. The trial court convicted the students, and the Supreme Court of South Carolina affirmed in an unreported decision.

== Opinion of the Court ==
The Supreme Court first considered the breach of peace convictions and noted that the students had simply remained sitting at the lunch counter when asked by the manager to leave. The State had argued that the students simply remaining could cause others to breach the peace when they saw the students. The Court rejected that argument, and did not find that the evidence supported a breach of peace conviction, and reversed.

Regarding the trespass convictions, the majority opinion by Justice Black did not reach the broad question posed by the defendants as to "whether the Fourteenth Amendment of its own force forbids a State to arrest and prosecute those who, having been asked to leave a restaurant because of their color, refuse to do so." Instead, the Court considered its ruling in Bouie v. City of Columbia, which had been announced the same day, which found that the South Carolina Supreme Court had expanded the scope of acts that were covered under its criminal trespass statute. The Supreme Court in that case held that retroactive application of this expanded scope violated due process as an ex post facto law, and the Barr decision references that decision for its holding.

The concurring opinion of Justice Douglas simply stated that he would reverse based upon his opinions in Bell v. Maryland, another case involving a sit-in demonstration by African American students that was announced the same day as the Barr decision. Justice Goldberg, joined by Chief Justice Warren, stated that they would reverse for the reasons stated in the majority opinion in Bell. Justices Black, Harlan, and White stated that they dissented for the same reasons stated in their Bouie dissent, that the actions in the restaurant did not constitute state action.

== Subsequent developments ==
Barr v. City of Columbia was one of five cases involving segregation protests decided on June 22, 1964. The other four cases were Griffin v. Maryland, Robinson v. Florida, Bouie v. City of Columbia, and Bell v. Maryland. In none of these cases did the Supreme Court reach the merits of any argument addressing whether private actions of segregation which are enforced by state courts constituted a state action which violated the Equal Protection Clause of the Fourteenth Amendment. These decisions were announced two days after the Senate ended a filibuster and passed the bill which would become the Civil Rights Act of 1964, which outlawed segregation in public accommodations. It has been suggested that the Supreme Court refrained from reaching the merits in these cases in consideration of the Act, had it done so it would have eliminated the basis for passage of the Act.

== See also ==
- Civil Rights Movement
