= Bouie v. City of Columbia =

- Supreme Court of the United States

Argued October 14 – October 15, 1963 Decided June 22, 1964
- Full case name: Simon Bouie and Talmadge J. Neal v. City of Columbia
- Citations: 378 U.S. 347 (more) 84 S. Ct. 1697, 12 L. Ed. 2d 894 (1964)

Case history
- Prior: 239 S.C. 570, 124 S.E.2d 332 (1962), upholding conviction for trespass

Holding
- The State Supreme Court gave retroactive application to its new construction of the statute, which deprived petitioners of their right to fair warning of a criminal prohibition and violated the Due Process Clause of the Fourteenth Amendment.

Court membership
- Chief Justice Earl Warren Associate Justices Hugo Black · William O. Douglas; Tom C. Clark · John M. Harlan II; William J. Brennan Jr. · Potter Stewart; Byron White · Arthur Goldberg

Case opinions
- Majority: Brennan, joined by Warren, Clark, Stewart, Goldberg
- Concurrence: Goldberg, joined by Warren
- Concurrence: Douglas
- Dissent: Black, joined by Harlan, White

Laws applied
- U.S. Const. amend. XIV

Bouie v. City of Columbia, 378 U.S. 347 (1964), was a case in which the US Supreme Court held that due process prohibits retroactive application of any judicial construction of a criminal statute that is unexpected and indefensible by reference to the law that has been expressed prior to the conduct in issue. The holding is based on the Fourteenth Amendment prohibition by the Due Process Clause of ex post facto laws.

== Background ==
On March 14, 1960, two African-American students from Allen University conducted a sit-in demonstration by sitting down at a booth at the lunch counter restaurant in an Eckerd's drugstore in Columbia, South Carolina. The policy at the store was to allow African-Americans to shop anywhere in the store and to use any facilities except for being served at the restaurant.

After they had sat down, an employee put up a "no trespassing sign," and the two students were asked to leave. Both were arrested on charges of breach of the peace and criminal trespass but convicted only for trespass in violation of the state code. The trespass convictions were upheld by the South Carolina Supreme Court.

== Decision ==
The majority opinion by Justice Brennan noted that the South Carolina trespass statute criminalized entry upon the lands of another after notice from an owner or tenant prohibiting such entry. The South Carolina Supreme Court, in upholding the convictions, had construed the statute as also covering the act of remaining on the premises of another after receiving notice to leave, a construction that had been adopted in another case in 1961.

The Court stated that a judicial construction that has the effect of broadening the activities that constitute a crime and is applied retroactively operates precisely like an ex post facto law. Since an ex post facto application of criminal statutes violates the Due Process Clause of the Fourteenth Amendment, the Court reversed the convictions.

The concurring opinions of Justice Goldberg and Justice Douglas stated simply that they would reverse based upon their opinions in Bell v. Maryland, 378 U.S. 226 (1964), another case involving a sit-in demonstration by African-American students that was announced the same day as Bouie.

The dissenting opinion by Justice Black argued that the conduct of remaining after being told to leave was understood to violate the South Carolina trespass statute, and Bell stated that the Fourteenth Amendment did not require an owner of a restaurant to serve customers.

== Critical response ==
Bouie v. City of Columbia was one of five cases involving segregation protests that were decided on June 22, 1964. The other four cases were Griffin v. Maryland, 378 U.S. 130 (1964), Barr v. City of Columbia, 378 U.S. 146 (1964), Robinson v. Florida, 378 U.S. 153 (1964), and Bell v. Maryland. In none of these cases did the Supreme Court reach the merits of any argument addressing whether private actions of segregation that are enforced by state courts constituted a state action, which violated the Equal Protection Clause of the Fourteenth Amendment. These decisions were announced two days after the Senate ended a filibuster and passed the bill which would become the Civil Rights Act of 1964, which outlawed segregation in public accommodations. It has been suggested that the Supreme Court refrained from reaching the merits in these cases in consideration of the Act; had it done so, it would have eliminated the basis for passage of the legislation.

== See also ==
- Civil Rights Movement
- List of United States Supreme Court cases, volume 378
