= Brubaker =

1980 film directed by Stuart Rosenberg

- Theatrical poster
- Directed by: Stuart Rosenberg
- Screenplay by: W. D. Richter
- Story by: W. D. Richter; Arthur Ross
- Based on: Accomplices to the Crime: The Arkansas Prison Scandal by: Tom Murton; Joe Hyams
- Produced by: Ron Silverman
- Starring: Robert Redford; Yaphet Kotto; Jane Alexander; Murray Hamilton; David Keith; Tim McIntire
- Cinematography: Bruno Nuytten
- Edited by: Robert Brown
- Music by: Lalo Schifrin
- Distributed by: 20th Century Fox
- Release date: June 20, 1980
- Running time: 131 minutes
- Country: United States
- Language: English
- Budget: $9-13 million
- Box office: $37.1 million (domestic)

Brubaker is a 1980 American prison drama film directed by Stuart Rosenberg. It stars Robert Redford as a newly arrived prison warden, Henry Brubaker, who attempts to clean up a corrupt and violent penal system. The screenplay by W. D. Richter is a fictionalized version of the 1969 book, Accomplices to the Crime: The Arkansas Prison Scandal by Tom Murton and Joe Hyams, detailing Murton's uncovering of the 1967 prison scandal. The film features a large supporting cast, including Yaphet Kotto, Jane Alexander, Murray Hamilton, David Keith, Tim McIntire, Matt Clark, M. Emmet Walsh, Everett McGill and an early appearance by Morgan Freeman. It was nominated for Best Original Screenplay at the 1981 Academy Awards.

== Plot ==
In 1969, Henry Brubaker arrives at Wakefield State Prison in Arkansas disguised as an inmate. He witnesses rampant abuse and corruption, including open and endemic sexual assault, torture, worm-ridden food, fraud, and rampant graft. During a dramatic standoff involving Walter, a deranged prisoner being held in solitary confinement, Brubaker reveals himself as the new prison warden, to the amazement of both prisoners and officials alike.

Brubaker attempts to reform the prison, with an eye towards prisoner rehabilitation and human rights, clashing frequently with corrupt officials on the state prison board who have profited from graft for decades. He recruits longtime prisoners, including trustys Larry Lee Bullen, Richard "Dickie" Coombes, and former warden's clerk Purcell (who secretly remains loyal to the unscrupulous trustys) to assist him. Lillian Gray, a public relations specialist for the governor's office, attempts to influence Brubaker to reform the prison in ways casting the governor in a positive light.

Brubaker fires his crooked bookkeeper, who sold a stash of illicit food ostensibly for inmates for a profit, tosses the former prison doctor out of the facility when he learns inmates were being charged for medical treatment, and burns down an illicit pleasure shack on prison grounds where influential trusty Huey Rauch and his girlfriend Carol live. After a roof cave-in in the prison barracks, Brubaker meets with C.P. Woodward, a lumber salesman and longtime participant in the prison graft scheme. Woodward's contract is terminated for using prisoners as slave labor, pocketing contract money and building a substandard roof. An inmate council is formed, allowing the inmates to govern themselves. At their first meeting, Abraham Cook, an elderly black inmate still imprisoned three years after the end of his sentence, confesses to Brubaker he was instructed to construct coffins for murdered prisoners. Abraham is lured to the medical ward by Eddie Caldwell, a sadistic trustee, Purcell, and Rauch, and he is tortured with a Tucker Telephone. Many of the members of the prison board are enraged at the disruption of their graft schemes and threaten to withdraw investments to improve the prison. Brubaker accuses the board head John Deach of defrauding the prison through fake insurance policies and uninsured buildings.

Brubaker discovers Abraham's body suspended from the flagpole outside his residence, and excavations near the prison locate multiple unmarked graves containing prisoners who died violently. Gray, a liberal prison board member named Edwards, and corrupt State Senator Hite, promise funding for the prison in exchange for a halt on excavations, telling him it is actually an abandoned pauper's graveyard. Coombes threatens Rauch over his participation in Abraham's death and Rauch escapes to a local restaurant, pursued by Brubaker and several trustys. Bullen and Rauch are killed in a shootout. The violence outside the prison enables the board to fire Brubaker. During a hearing about the exhumed bodies Brubaker interrupts the board's false testimony with a comment about saving taxpayer money by shooting prisoners.

Brubaker exits the prison as the new warden, hardline disciplinarian Rory Poke, addresses the inmates. Coombes approaches Brubaker and tells him simply, "You were right." Coombes begins clapping, and the convicts ignore Poke and approach the fence, clapping a farewell to a teary Brubaker.

A pre-credits title card reads:

Two years after Henry Brubaker was fired -- 24 inmates, led by Richard "Dickie" Coombes, brought suit against Wakefield Prison. The Court ruled that the treatment of prisoners at Wakefield was unconstitutional and ordered the prison be reformed or closed. The governor was not re-elected.

== Cast ==
- Robert Redford as Henry Brubaker
- Yaphet Kotto as Dickie Coombes
- Jane Alexander as Lillian Gray
- Murray Hamilton as John Deach
- David Keith as Larry Lee Bullen
- Morgan Freeman as Walter
- Matt Clark as Purcell
- Tim McIntire as Huey Rauch
- Richard Ward as Abraham Cook
- M. Emmet Walsh as C.P. Woodward
- Albert Salmi as Rory Poke
- Linda Haynes as Carol
- Everett McGill as Eddie Caldwell
- Val Avery as Wendel
- Ronald C. Frazier as Willets
- David D. Harris as Duane Spivey
- Joe Spinell as Floyd Birdwell
- James Keane as Pinky
- Konrad Sheehan as Glenn Elwood
- Vic Polizos as Billy Baylock

In addition, Wilford Brimley, Nathan George and William Newman appeared as Prison Board Members, John McMartin as State Senator Charles Hite.

== Production ==
=== Screenplay ===
The film is based on the real-life experiences of warden Thomas Murton, co-author with Joe Hyams of the 1969 book, Accomplices to the Crime: The Arkansas Prison Scandal. In 1967, he was hired by Governor Winthrop Rockefeller to reform Arkansas' Tucker State and Cummins State Prison Farms, but Murton was dismissed less than a year into the job because his work was creating too much bad publicity for the state's penal system—in particular, the discovery of numerous graves belonging to prisoners who had been killed in these prisons. Much of the squalid conditions, violence, and corruption depicted in the film was the subject of a 1970 federal court case, Holt v. Sarver, in which the federal court ruled that Arkansas' prison system violated inmates' constitutional rights, and ordered reform.

The film was originally based on the Louisiana State Prison (Angola) but the State of Louisiana successfully sued to block publication of both the novel and the screenplay if it made references to conditions at Angola. Due to the successful legal outcome, violence and slavery-era treatment of inmates at Angola continued unabated throughout the 1980s and 1990s until two lawsuits were filed in 2013 regarding medical care and inhumane treatment, and excessive high temperatures at the facility. Angola's solitary confinement block, which had no air conditioning and had the highest suicide rates in the United States, was closed in 2018 after a 2013 lawsuit.

=== Filming ===
Rosenberg replaced Bob Rafelson, who was removed as director early in production. This would become Rosenberg's second prison film after directing Cool Hand Luke in 1967. Rafelson filed a breach-of-contract and slander lawsuit in May 1979 asking for damages of $10 million, claiming that Fox had assured him that he would have complete autonomy and creative control and had made statements that implied that he was incompetent, emotionally unstable, and not qualified to direct a major motion picture.

Most exteriors were filmed at the then-recently closed Junction City Prison in Junction City, southeast of Columbus in central Ohio. Additional locations included Bremen, New Lexington, and the Fairfield County Fairgrounds in Lancaster. The opening scenes of the prison bus departure show the skyline and a view up South Front Street in Columbus.

=== Novelization ===
A paperback screenplay novelization by the celebrated and award-winning American novelist and short story writer William Harrison was issued shortly in advance of the film's release (as was the custom of the era) by Ballantine Books.

== Reception ==
Brubaker was a critical and commercial success. Produced on a budget of $9 million, the film grossed $37,121,708 in North America, earning $19.3 million in theatrical rentals, making it the 19th highest-grossing film of 1980. The movie was also well received by critics, holding a 75% "Fresh" rating on the review aggregate website Rotten Tomatoes based on 24 reviews.

Roger Ebert of the Chicago Sun-Times wrote:

The movie (refuses) to permit its characters more human dimensions. We want to know these people better, but the screenplay throws up a wall; they act according to the ideological positions assigned to them in the screenplay, and that's that. ... Half of Redford's speeches could have come out of newspaper editorials, but we never find out much about him, What's his background? Was he ever married? Is this his first prison job? What's his relationship with the Jane Alexander character, who seems to have gotten him this job? (Alexander has one almost subliminal moment when she fans her neck and looks at Redford and, seems to be thinking unpolitical thoughts, but the movie hurries on.) Brubaker is a well-crafted film that does a harrowingly effective job of portraying the details of its prison, but then it populates it with positions rather than people."

== Accolades ==
Wins

- Motion Picture Sound Editors: Golden Reel Award. Best Sound Editing.

Nominations

- Academy Awards: Best Writing, Screenplay Written Directly for the Screen, W.D. Richter (screenplay/story) and Arthur A. Ross (story).

== See also ==
- List of American films of 1980
- Arkansas Prison scandal
- Fast-Walking (1982)
- Runaway Train (1985)
- American Me (1992)
- The Shawshank Redemption (1994)
