= Wahhabi Islam: From Revival and Reform to Global Jihad =

2004 book by Nathan J. DeLong-Bas

- Author: Natana J. DeLong-Bas
- Language: English
- Subject: Wahhabism
- Publisher: Oxford University Press
- Publication date: July 15, 2004
- Publication place: United States
- ISBN: 0-19-516991-3

Wahhabi Islam: From Revival and Reform to Global Jihad is a 2004 book by academic Natana J. DeLong-Bas, published by Oxford University Press. It is based "on a close study of the 14 volumes" of collected works of Wahhabism's founder, Muhammad ibn Abd al-Wahhab and has been called "the first extensive explication of the theology" of Wahhabism.

It is divided into sections: a brief religious biography and history of Ibn Abd al-Wahhab, theology, Islamic law, women and Wahhabism, jihad and the evolution of Wahhabism.

== Critical reception ==
Wahhabi Islam: From Revival and Reform to Global Jihad has been praised as a "monumental work ... lucid and carefully documented", "often fascinating", and presenting "a nuanced discussion of Wahhab's Quranic interpretation", but also criticized as a "piece of scholarly trash" and of "markedly inferior quality", and guilty of "special pleading".

It has received positive reviews. David E. Long of Middle East Journal who called it a "monumental work ... a lucid and carefully documented assessment of Wahhabism." Sara Powell of Washington Report on Middle East Affairs described it as "...a well-regarded, logically constructed, and considered --if perhaps somewhat sympathetic--analysis of Abd al-Wahhab's beliefs." History magazine called it "a ground-breaking study ... both controversial and informative"

However, others have questioned the book and DeLong-Bas's views on Wahhabism. Author Stephen Suleyman Schwartz has called her an "apologist", criticizing her for among other things, receiving financial support from Saudi Arabia; not including as a source the correspondence of ibn Abd al-Wahhab, "which critics of Wahhabism and other Saudis consider key to understanding him"; and failing to mention the religious and/or governmental background of some Saudi Arabians mentioned in her acknowledgments.

Reviewer Michael J. Ybarra, called the book "often fascinating", and providing "a nuanced discussion of Wahhab's Quranic interpretation", but also complained that she "seems to bend over backward to give Wahhab the benefit of the doubt while dismissing his critics as biased." He also notes that DeLong-Bas "doesn't say ... where on earth" the tolerant form of Wahhabism described by her "ever existed", and that "the voice of Wahhab himself is largely absent from this book" because the author rarely quotes him.

Khaled Abou El Fadl, professor of law at University of California, Los Angeles who writes frequently on Islamic jurisprudence, expressed sorrow that Oxford University Press had published the book, stating "This doesn't qualify as scholarship -- it falls within the general phenomenon of Saudi apologetics."
