= Natana J. DeLong-Bas =

American scholar of Middle Eastern and Islamic studies

Natana J. DeLong-Bas is an American academic, scholar of Middle Eastern and Islamic studies, and author of a number of academic publications on Islam on the subjects of Saudi Arabia and Wahhabism, Islamic thought and history, Islam and politics, and contemporary jihadism.

== Biography ==
DeLong-Bas is associate professor at the Theology Department Faculty of Boston College. She also serves in a number of editorial, advisory, and consulting roles. Previously DeLong-Bas has taught at Brandeis University and worked as a consultant for the RAND Corporation.

== Views ==
DeLong-Bas has expressed the view that there is too much negativity towards Wahhabism in the West, and in her writings has argued that Muhammad ibn Abd al-Wahhab was "not the godfather of contemporary terrorist movements", but

"a voice of reform, reflecting mainstream eighteenth-century Islamic thought. His vision of Islamic society was based upon monotheism in which Muslims, Christians, and Jews were to enjoy peaceful co-existence and cooperative commercial treaty relations."

DeLong-Bas believes that Islamic extremism in Saudi Arabia "does not stem from" Islam, but from issues such as the oppression of the Palestinian people, "Iraq, and the American government's tying [the hands of] the U.N. [and preventing it] from adopting any resolution against Israel, have definitely added to the Muslim youth's state of frustration."

In a 2006 interview published on the London-based Arabic international newspaper Asharq Al-Awsat, DeLong-Bas was quoted as stating that she did "...not find any evidence that would make me agree that Osama bin Laden was behind the Attack on the Twin Towers". A month later in The Justice—the student newspaper of Brandeis University (where she was teaching at the time) -- she disputed the quote, stating: "Of course he did. He's the CEO of Al-Qaeda and the leader of their political agenda. All I claimed was that he didn't have anything to do with the logistics or the planning of the attacks themselves."

== Wahhabi Islam: From Revival and Reform to Global Jihad ==
DeLong-Bas's book Wahhabi Islam: From Revival and Reform to Global Jihad was published in 2004 by Oxford University Press. It is based "on a close study of the 14 volumes" of collected works of Wahhabism's founder, Muhammad ibn Abd al-Wahhab, and has been called "the first extensive explication of the theology" of Wahhabism. It is divided into sections: a brief religious biography and history of Ibn Abd al-Wahhab, theology, Islamic law, women and Wahhabism, jihad and the evolution of Wahhabism.

=== Critical reception ===
Wahhabi Islam: From Revival and Reform to Global Jihad has been praised as a "monumental work ... lucid and carefully documented", "often fascinating", and presenting "a nuanced discussion of Wahhab's Quranic interpretation", but also criticized as a "piece of scholarly trash" and of "markedly inferior quality", and guilty of "special pleading".

It has received positive reviews from David E. Long in Middle East Journal (a "monumental work ... a lucid and carefully documented assessment of Wahhabism."), Sara Powell in Washington Report on Middle East Affairs ("...a well-regarded, logically constructed, and considered --if perhaps somewhat sympathetic--analysis of Abd al-Wahhab's beliefs"), History magazine ("a ground-breaking study ... both controversial and informative").

Journalist and author Michael J. Ybarra called the book "often fascinating", and providing "a nuanced discussion of Wahhab's Quranic interpretation", but also complained that she "seems to bend over backward to give Wahhab the benefit of the doubt while dismissing his critics as biased." He also notes that DeLong-Bas "doesn't say ... where on earth" the tolerant form of Wahhabism described by her "ever existed", and that "the voice of Wahhab himself is largely absent from this book" because the author rarely quotes him.

Khaled Abou El Fadl, professor of law at the University of California, Los Angeles who writes frequently on Islamic jurisprudence, expressed sorrow that Oxford University Press had published the book, stating "This doesn't qualify as scholarship -- it falls within the general phenomenon of Saudi apologetics."

Michael Sells, professor at the University of Chicago, wrote that DeLong-Bas never challenges the propriety of Abd al-Wahhab's claim to authority to distinguish believers from unbelievers and to impose the most severe sanctions on those he disagrees with. Simon Ross Valentine suggested that the image of Wahhabism presented by Delong-Bas is a "rewriting of history that flies in the face of historical fact".

== Bibliography ==
- Islam: A Living Faith Winona, MN: Anselm Academic, 2018.
- Shariah: What Everyone Needs to Know Co-authored with John L. Esposito. New York: Oxford University Press, 2018.
- The Oxford Encyclopedia of Islam and Women 2 vols. Editor-in-Chief. New York: Oxford University Press, 2013. Winner of the 2014 Prose Award Honorable Mention for multi-volume reference from the American Publishing Association. https://www.oxfordreference.com/view/10.1093/acref:oiso/9780199764464.001.0001/acref-9780199764464
- Wahhabi Islam: From Revival and Reform to Global Jihad (rev. ed., Oxford University Press, 2008)
- Notable Muslims: Muslim Builders of World Civilization and Culture (OneWorld, 2006)
- Women in Muslim Family Law (co-author with John L. Esposito, rev. ed., Syracuse University Press, 2001)
- Asma Afsaruddin (1958): Einfuhrung, in Ernst Furlinger und Senad Kusur (Hg.) Islam und religioser Pluralismus: Grundlagen einer dialogischen muslimischen Religionstheologie. Zurich: Theologischer Verlag Zurich, 2019, 117–123.
- Preface to Women Writers of Saudi Arabia: Poetry, Novels and Short Stories., Ieman Abdulrahman Alkhayal and Nawal Mursi Ahmed. Surbiton, UK: King Faisal Center for Research and Islamic Studies and Arabian Publishing Ltd., 2019.
- Islamic Law and Gender, Oxford Bibliographies in Islamic Studies, Editor-in-Chief John O. Voll. New York: Oxford University Press, March/April 2019. Available at www.oxfordbibliographies.com.
- Islam, Nature and the Environment, Oxford Bibliographies in Islamic Studies, Editor-in-Chief John O. Voll. New York: Oxford University Press, 2018. Available at www.oxfordbibliographies.com.
- Jihad. Oxford Bibliographies Online – Islamic Studies. New York: Oxford University Press, February 22, 2018. Available at www.oxfordbibliographies.com.
- Rising Sectarianism in the Middle East and Its Impact on American Perceptions of Islam and Muslims, Journal of South Asian and Middle Eastern Studies, Vol. XL, No. 4, Summer 2017, 1-21.
- Sectarianism in Saudi Arabia: The Challenges and Opportunities of Wasatiyya and Wataniyya, Maydan Inaugural Journal, Ali Vural Ak Center for Global Islamic Studies, George Mason University, November 17, 2016. Available at: http://www.themaydan.com/2016/11/sectarianism-saudi-arabia-challenges-opportunities-wasatiyya-wataniyya/.
- Between Conflict and Coexistence: Saudi Shi'is as Subjects, Objects, and Agents in Wasatiyya and Wataniyya, Journal of Islamic and Muslim Studies, Vol. 1, No. 1, May 2016, pp. 47–64.
- Focus On: Sectarianism in the Age of Endless War, Oxford Islamic Studies Online, January 2016.
- Foreign Policy in Saudi Arabia, in Global Perspectives on Foreign Policy of Major Powers, ed. Ajit Banerjee. New Delhi, India: Academic Foundation, 2016, for a project to train young foreign policy analysis in developing countries initiated by the United Nations.
- Political Islam in Saudi Arabia, in The Oxford Handbook of Islam and Politics, eds. John L. Esposito and Emad El-Din Shahin. New York: Oxford University Press, 2013.
- Rolling Stone: Cutting Edge or Cutting Deep?, published globally through Common Ground News Service, July 2013.
- Algeria, in The Oxford Encyclopedia of Islam and Women, Editor-in-Chief, Natana J. DeLong-Bas. New York: Oxford University Press, 2013.
- Barakah, in The Oxford Encyclopedia of Islam and Women, Editor-in-Chief, Natana J. DeLong-Bas. New York: Oxford University Press, 2013.
- Bouhired, Djamila, in The Oxford Encyclopedia of Islam and Women, Editor-in-Chief, Natana J. DeLong-Bas. New York: Oxford University Press, 2013.
- Culture and Expression: Theoretical Overview, in The Oxford Encyclopedia of Islam and Women, Editor-in-Chief, Natana J. DeLong-Bas. New York: Oxford University Press, 2013.
- Dhimmi, in The Oxford Encyclopedia of Islam and Women, Editor-in-Chief, Natana J. DeLong-Bas. New York: Oxford University Press, 2013.
- Feminism: Concept and Debates, in The Oxford Encyclopedia of Islam and Women, Editor-in-Chief, Natana J. DeLong-Bas. New York: Oxford University Press, 2013.
- Feminism: Nature of Islamic Feminism, in The Oxford Encyclopedia of Islam and Women, Editor-in-Chief, Natana J. DeLong-Bas. New York: Oxford University Press, 2013.
- Gender Construction: Early Islam, in The Oxford Encyclopedia of Islam and Women, Editor-in-Chief, Natana J. DeLong-Bas. New York: Oxford University Press, 2013.
- Gender Studies and Women: History of the Field, in The Oxford Encyclopedia of Islam and Women, Editor-in-Chief, Natana J. DeLong-Bas. New York: Oxford University Press, 2013.
- Honor, in The Oxford Encyclopedia of Islam and Women, Editor-in-Chief, Natana J. DeLong-Bas. New York: Oxford University Press, 2013.
- Hygiene, in The Oxford Encyclopedia of Islam and Women, Editor-in-Chief, Natana J. DeLong-Bas. New York: Oxford University Press, 2013.
- Immigration and Minorities: Theoretical Overview, in The Oxford Encyclopedia of Islam and Women, Editor-in-Chief, Natana J. DeLong-Bas. New York: Oxford University Press, 2013.
- International League of Muslim Women, in The Oxford Encyclopedia of Islam and Women, Editor-in-Chief, Natana J. DeLong-Bas. New York: Oxford University Press, 2013.
- Investment and Commerce, Women's Historical Practices, with Sara Bazoobandi in The Oxford Encyclopedia of Islam and Women, Editor-in-Chief, Natana J. DeLong-Bas. New York: Oxford University Press, 2013.
- Islam and Women: 18th to early 20th Century Debates, with Farkhonda Zia Mansoor, in The Oxford Encyclopedia of Islam and Women, Editor-in-Chief, Natana J. DeLong-Bas. New York: Oxford University Press, 2013.
- Jameelah, Maryam, in The Oxford Encyclopedia of Islam and Women, Editor-in-Chief, Natana J. DeLong-Bas. New York: Oxford University Press, 2013.
- Khawarij, in The Oxford Encyclopedia of Islam and Women, Editor-in-Chief, Natana J. DeLong-Bas. New York: Oxford University Press, 2013.
- Marriage: Contemporary, with Zaher Oter, in The Oxford Encyclopedia of Islam and Women, Editor-in-Chief, Natana J. DeLong-Bas. New York: Oxford University Press, 2013.
- Mourning, in The Oxford Encyclopedia of Islam and Women, Editor-in-Chief, Natana J. DeLong-Bas. New York: Oxford University Press, 2013.
- Politics and Polity, Theoretical Overview, in The Oxford Encyclopedia of Islam and Women, Editor-in-Chief, Natana J. DeLong-Bas. New York: Oxford University Press, 2013.
- Purification, in The Oxford Encyclopedia of Islam and Women, Editor-in-Chief, Natana J. DeLong-Bas. New York: Oxford University Press, 2013.
- Scholarly Approaches and Theoretical Constructs, in The Oxford Encyclopedia of Islam and Women, Editor-in-Chief, Natana J. DeLong-Bas. New York: Oxford University Press, 2013.
- Sharia, Fiqh, Philosophy and Reason: Theoretical Overview, in The Oxford Encyclopedia of Islam and Women, Editor-in-Chief, Natana J. DeLong-Bas. New York: Oxford University Press, 2013.
- United Nations Fund for Population Activities, in The Oxford Encyclopedia of Islam and Women, Editor-in-Chief, Natana J. DeLong-Bas. New York: Oxford University Press, 2013.
- Wahhabiyah, in The Oxford Encyclopedia of Islam and Women, Editor-in-Chief, Natana J. DeLong-Bas. New York: Oxford University Press, 2013.
- Wealth, Welfare and Labor, in The Oxford Encyclopedia of Islam and Women, Editor-in-Chief, Natana J. DeLong-Bas. New York: Oxford University Press, 2013.
- Women and Social Protest, with Ala'i Nadjib in The Oxford Encyclopedia of Islam and Women, Editor-in-Chief, Natana J. DeLong-Bas. New York: Oxford University Press, 2013.
- Workforce, Women in the: Historical Discourse, with in The Oxford Encyclopedia of Islam and Women, Editor-in-Chief, Natana J. DeLong-Bas. New York: Oxford University Press, 2013.
- Women of the Arab Spring, Beyond Objects and Subjects, published globally through Common Ground News Service, January 2013.
- Saudi 'Islamic Solidarity Summit' spans Sectarian Divisions, September 11, 2012, published globally through Common Ground News Service.
- Muhammad Ibn 'Abd al-Wahhab, in I.B. Tauris Biographical Dictionary of Islamic Civilization, ed. Mustafa Shah. London: I. B. Tauris, 2012.
- Muhammad Ibn Sa'ud, in I.B. Tauris Biographical Dictionary of Islamic Civilization, ed. Mustafa Shah. London: I. B. Tauris, 2012.
- All American Muslims, and Christians, Op-Ed piece, December 2011, published globally through Common Ground News Service.
- The Women of the Arab Spring: Their Issues are Everyone's Issues, October 2011, published globally through Common Ground News Service.
- The Norway Attacks and the Price of Fear, Op-Ed piece, July 2011, published globally through Common Ground News Service.
- Driving toward gender equality in Saudi Arabia, Op-Ed piece, July 2011, published globally through Common Ground News Service.
- Women of the Arab Spring: from protesters to parliamentarians?, Op-Ed piece, June 2011, published throughout the US, Middle East, Europe and Southeast Asia through Common Ground News Service.
- Focus On: The New Social Media and the Arab Spring, Oxford Islamic Studies Online, May 2011.
- Focus On: Saudi Arabia – Challenges for the 21st Century, March 2011.
- Focus On: Interfaith Dialogue, Oxford Islamic Studies Online, March 2010.
- What Saudi Women Really Want, Saudi Arabia, 1979–2009. Washington, DC: Middle East Institute, October 2009.
- Five Pillars, Oxford Bibliographies Online – Islamic Studies. New York: Oxford University Press, 2009.
- Wahhabism, Oxford Bibliographies Online – Islamic Studies. New York: Oxford University Press, 2009.
- Al-Qa'ida, Oxford Bibliographies Online – Islamic Studies. New York: Oxford University Press, 2009.
- Jihad. Oxford Bibliographies Online – Islamic Studies. New York: Oxford University Press, 2009.
- Wahhabis. The Encyclopedia of Global Religions. SAGE Publications, Inc, 2009.
- Bin Baz, Shaykh. The Encyclopaedia of Islam, 3rd edition. Leiden: E.J. Brill, 2008.
- Osama bin Laden. The Oxford Encyclopedia of the Islamic World. New York: Oxford University Press, 2009.
- Al-Qa'ida. The Oxford Encyclopedia of the Islamic World. New York: Oxford University Press, 2009.
- Wahhabism, The Oxford Encyclopedia of the Islamic World. New York: Oxford University Press, 2009.
- Wahhabism, Encyclopedia of the Modern World. Oxford University Press, 2008.
- Jihad and the Wahhabi Tradition: Continuity or Change? in Islam and Jihad: Theology and Politics, ed. Taj Hargey. 2008.
- Muhammad Ibn Abd al-Wahhab and Wahhabi Ideology: Do Ibn Abd al-Wahhab's Teachings Matter to Contemporary Wahhabis? in Understanding Wahhabism, ed. Mohammad Ayoub. East Lansing, MI: Michigan State University Press, 2008.
- Usama bin Ladin, Biographical Encyclopedia of the Modern Middle East, ed. Michael R. Fishbach. Gale Cengage, 2007.
- Focus On: Women, Islam and the Twenty-first Century, lead article for Oxford Islamic Studies Online launch, October 2007.
- World History Chronology, for Oxford Islamic Studies Online, launched October 2007.
- Islamic History Chronology, for Oxford Islamic Studies Online, launched October 2007.
- Jihad in the Wahhabi Tradition: Continuity and Change, in Understanding Jihad, Deconstructing Jihadism, eds. Caroline Ziemke and M.A. Muqtedar Khan. Institute for Defense Analysis and Prince Alwaleed bin Talal Center for Muslim-Christian Understanding, 2007.
- Children in Saudi Arabia, in Greenwood Encyclopedia of Children's Issues Worldwide, ed. Ghada Talhami. Greenwood Publishing Group, 2007.
- On Jihad and Terrorism, or Wahhabism versus Jihadism, Al-Daawah Magazine, Saudi Arabia, March 2005.
- Daw'ah and Jihad in the Works of Muhammad Ibn Abd al-Wahhab: An Ideology for Expansionism?, in Wahhabism Revisited (working title), ed, David Commins. Riyadh: King Abd al-Aziz Center for Research and Archives, forthcoming 2005.
- Terrorism in Riyadh: A View from Within, Al-Daawah Magazine, Saudi Arabia, June 2004.
- Wahhabis, Encyclopaedia of the Quran, ed. Jane Dammen McAuliffe. Leiden: E.J. Brill, 2004.
- Classical Islam, John L. Esposito with Natana J. De Long-Bas, in God's Rule: The Politics of World Religions, ed. Jacob Neusner. Washington, DC: Georgetown University Press, 2003.
- Modern Islam, John L. Esposito with Natana J. De Long-Bas, in God's Rule: The Politics of World Religions, ed. Jacob Neusner. Washington, DC: Georgetown University Press, 2003.
