= Robinson v. Florida =

- Supreme Court of the United States

Argued October 15, 1963 Decided June 22, 1964
- Full case name: James Russell Robinson et al., v. Florida
- Citations: 378 U.S. 153 (more) 84 S. Ct. 1693; 12 L. Ed. 2d 771; 1964 U.S. LEXIS 821

Case history
- Prior: Conviction affirmed, 144 So.2d 811 (Fla. 1962); probable jurisdiction noted, 378 U.S. 153 (1963).
- Subsequent: 167 So.2d 307 (Fla. 1964), vacated prior decision and remand to trial court.

Holding
- The state convictions violated the Equal Protection Clause of the Fourteenth Amendment as the state, through regulations requiring separate facilities for each race in a restaurant, had become involved in bringing about segregation.

Court membership
- Chief Justice Earl Warren Associate Justices Hugo Black · William O. Douglas; Tom C. Clark · John M. Harlan II; William J. Brennan Jr. · Potter Stewart; Byron White · Arthur Goldberg

Case opinions
- Majority: Black, joined by Warren, Brennan, White, Clark, Stewart, Goldberg
- Concurrence: Douglas
- Concurrence: Harlan

Laws applied
- U.S. Const. Amend. XIV

Robinson v. Florida, 378 U.S. 153 (1964), was a case in which the Supreme Court of the United States reversed the convictions of several white and African American persons who were refused service at a restaurant based upon a prior Court decision, holding that a Florida regulation requiring a restaurant that employed or served persons of both races to have separate lavatory rooms resulted in the state becoming entangled in racial discriminatory activity in violation of the Equal Protection Clause of the Fourteenth Amendment to the United States Constitution.

== Background ==
Eighteen white and African American persons went to a restaurant in Shell's Department Store in Miami, Florida. Consistent with the restaurant's policy of refusing service to blacks, the restaurant manager requested the persons to leave. When they refused, they were arrested for violation of a statute allowing a restaurant to have a right to remove any person that it considered detrimental to serve. At trial the defendants argued that their arrest, prosecution, and conviction by the state for requesting service at a restaurant that refused service to African Americans would violate the Equal Protection Clause of the Fourteenth Amendment. The trial court stayed the adjudication of guilt and, consistent with state law, placed them on probation. On appeal, the Supreme Court of Florida affirmed, holding that the statute under which the convictions were made was nondiscriminatory and thus did not violate equal protection.

== Court's Decision ==
The majority opinion by Justice Black did not reach the broad question posed by the defendants as to "whether the Fourteenth Amendment of its own force forbids a State to arrest and prosecute those who, having been asked to leave a restaurant because of their color, refuse to do so." Instead, the Court considered its prior ruling in Peterson v. Greenville, 373 U.S. 244 (1963), which ruled that a state law making it unlawful for restaurants to serve black and white persons in the same room or at the same table or counter constituted state action in violation of the Equal Protection Clause of the Fourteenth Amendment. Florida had a regulation requiring any restaurant to have separate toilet and lavatory rooms for each race or sex served or employed. While this regulation did not directly and expressly forbid restaurants from serving both whites and blacks together, it burdened any restaurant serving both races, a state action in violation of the Equal Protection Clause as stated in Peterson.

The concurring opinion of Justice Douglas simply stated that he would reverse based upon his opinions in Bell v. Maryland, 378 U.S. 226 (1964), another case involving a sit-in demonstration by African American students that was announced the same day as the Robinson decision. Justice Harlan stated that he was bound by the decision of Peterson and acquiesced in the judgement of the majority.

== Critical response ==
Robinson v. Florida was one of five cases involving segregation protests decided on June 22, 1964. The other four cases were Griffin v. Maryland, 378 U.S. 130 (1964), Barr v. City of Columbia, 378 U.S. 146 (1964), Bouie v. City of Columbia, 378 U.S. 347 (1964), and Bell v. Maryland. In none of these cases did the Supreme Court reach the merits of any argument addressing whether private actions of segregation which are enforced by state courts constituted a state action which violated the Equal Protection Clause of the Fourteenth Amendment. These decisions were announced two days after the Senate ended a filibuster and passed the bill which would become the Civil Rights Act of 1964, which outlawed segregation in public accommodations. It has been suggested that the Supreme Court refrained from reaching the merits in these cases in consideration of the Act, because had it done so it would have eliminated the basis for passage of the Act.

== See also ==
- Civil Rights Movement
- List of United States Supreme Court cases, volume 378
