= Griffin v. Maryland =

- Supreme Court of the United States

Argued October 14 – October 15, 1963 Decided June 22, 1964
- Full case name: William L. Griffin et al. v. Maryland
- Citations: 378 U.S. 130 (more) 84 S. Ct. 1770; 12 L. Ed. 2d 754; 1964 U.S. LEXIS 818

Case history
- Prior: 225 Md. 422, 171 A.2d 717, affirmed conviction
- Subsequent: 236 Md. 184, 202 A.2d 644 (1964), reversing conviction without new trial

Holding
- The convictions violated the equal protection clause of the Fourteenth Amendment and the arrest by a park employee, who was also a deputy sheriff, was state action.

Court membership
- Chief Justice Earl Warren Associate Justices Hugo Black · William O. Douglas; Tom C. Clark · John M. Harlan II; William J. Brennan Jr. · Potter Stewart; Byron White · Arthur Goldberg

Case opinions
- Majority: Warren, joined by Douglas, Clark, Brennan, Stewart, Goldberg,
- Concurrence: Clark
- Dissent: Harlan, joined by Black, White

Laws applied
- U.S. Const. amend. XIV

Griffin v. Maryland, 378 U.S. 130 (1964), was a case in which the Supreme Court of the United States reversed the convictions of five African Americans who were arrested during a protest of a privately owned amusement park by a park employee who was also a deputy sheriff. The Court found that the convictions violated the Equal Protection Clause of the Fourteenth Amendment.

== Background ==
Five African American college students were part of a June 30, 1960, protest which picketed the racial exclusionary policies of the privately owned and operated Glen Echo Amusement Park located in Montgomery County, Maryland, which had a policy of excluding any blacks who wished to patronize its facilities. There were no signs indicating this exclusionary policy, nor were tickets required for admission. The students used tickets purchased by others and boarded a carousel. A park employee who was also a deputy sheriff saw the students and, after consulting with the park manager, told the students that they were not permitted on any of the rides, and had five minutes to leave the park. After the five minutes had expired, they were arrested for criminal trespass. The five students, William L. Griffin, Marvous Saunders, Michael Proctor, Cecil T. Washington, Jr., and Gwendolyn Greene, were convicted of criminal trespass in the Circuit Court of Montgomery County and ordered to pay a fine of $100. The convictions were upheld in the Maryland Court of Appeals, noting the arrests were "an enforcement by the operator of the park of its lawful policy of segregation," and did not constitute any acton by the state.

== Court's decision ==
The Supreme Court had previously found that state action in support of segregation was a violation of the Equal Protection Clause of the Fourteenth Amendment in Pennsylvania v. Board of Directors of City Trusts of Philadelphia, 353 U.S. 230 (1957). The Court concluded the arrests by the deputy sheriff, acting under his own authority, constituted state action enforcing a policy of segregation and was therefore in violation of this clause.

The concurring opinion of Justice Douglas described the majority opinion as holding, under the particular facts of the case, that the state was a joint participant in the policy of segregation. The dissent by Justice Harlan stated that he did not believe that the participation by the deputy sheriff was any different from if a policeman arrested the students after a complaint had been made by the park, and believed that the principles discussed in the dissent of Justice Black in Bell v. Maryland, 378 U.S. 318 (1964) applied to this case. The dissent in Bell had argued that private actions involving segregation were not within the scope of the Equal Protection Clause of the Fourteenth Amendment.

== Critical response ==
Griffin v. Maryland was one of five cases involving segregation protests decided on June 22, 1964. The other four cases were Barr v. City of Columbia, 378 U.S. 146 (1964), Robinson v. Florida, 378 U.S. 153 (1964), Bouie v. City of Columbia, 378 U.S. 347, and Bell v. Maryland, 378 U.S. 226 (1964). In none of these cases did the Supreme Court reach the merits of any argument addressing whether private actions of segregation which are enforced by state courts constituted a state action which violated the Equal Protection Clause of the Fourteenth Amendment. These decisions were announced two days after the Senate ended a filibuster and passed the bill which would become the Civil Rights Act of 1964, which outlawed segregation in public accommodations. It has been suggested that the Supreme Court refrained from reaching the merits in these cases in consideration of the Act; had it done so it would have eliminated the basis for passage of the Act.

== See also ==
- Civil Rights Movement
- List of United States Supreme Court cases, volume 378
