= Joe Hyams =

American columnist and biographer (1923–2008)

- Born: June 6, 1923; Cambridge, Massachusetts, U.S.
- Died: November 8, 2008 (aged 85); Denver, Colorado, U.S.
- Occupations: Syndicated columnist, author
- Spouse(s): 4, including Elke Sommer (m. 1964; div. 1981) Melissa Hyams (m. 1994)
- Children: 4

Joseph Hyams (June 6, 1923 – November 8, 2008) was an American Hollywood columnist and author of bestselling biographies of Hollywood stars.

== Career ==
Hyams was born in Cambridge, Massachusetts, on June 6, 1923, and grew up in nearby Brookline. While attending Harvard University, he enlisted in the United States Army in 1942. He received a Purple Heart and was awarded the Bronze Star Medal while serving in the South Pacific. He later covered the war for Stars and Stripes, the official newspaper of the United States Armed Forces. He earned bachelor's and master's degrees at New York University, after returning from military service.

In 1951, the New York Herald Tribune sent him to do an article on illegal immigration to the United States. He was flown to Mexico on a small airplane and came back into the United States with a group crossing the border illegally. Once the story was complete, his editor told him that a room was waiting for him at the Beverly Hills Hotel. "Take a break, and if you get a chance to interview any movie stars, go for it." Asked by a man seated at the hotel's pool what he was doing at the hotel, he replied that he was supposed to interview movie stars. "How would you like to interview Humphrey Bogart?" was the reply from what turned out to be Bogart's press agent. When Hyams arrived, Bogart was behind the bar and offered him a drink. Hyams asked for a Coke and Bogart reacted angrily: "I don't trust any bastard who doesn't drink, especially a pipe-smoking newspaperman… or a man who has more hair than I have." At this, Hyams pocketed his notebook and headed for the door. "I don't drink," he said on his way out, "and I certainly have more hair on my head than you do." Bogart liked the courage of the reply and not only granted Hyams an interview, but as soon as it appeared invited him to lunch. In addition to the interview with Humphrey Bogart, within the week Hyams had interviewed Lauren Bacall, Katharine Hepburn, Frank Sinatra and Spencer Tracy. The Herald Tribune had him relocated to Los Angeles. He covered Hollywood as a syndicated columnist from 1951 to 1964.

After leaving the Herald Tribune, Hyams covered Hollywood for the Saturday Evening Post, Ladies' Home Journal, Redbook and other publications.

He was the author (or co-author) of more than two-dozen books, most of which were biographies of the celebrities he covered, including Bogie in 1966, Bogart & Bacall: A Love Story in 1975 and James Dean: Little Boy Lost in 1992 (co-authored with his son, Jay). He co-authored celebrity autobiographies, with Chuck Norris on The Secret of Inner Strength: My Story and worked on Michael Reagan: On the Outside Looking In, with the adopted son of the former President. His own autobiography, Mislaid in Hollywood, was written in 1973. He also wrote novels set in Hollywood, such as The Pool and Murder at the Academy Awards.

His 1979 book Zen in the Martial Arts was built on his many years of studying martial arts with such figures as Bong-soo Han, Bruce Lee, and Ed Parker. He first became involved in the martial arts during his wartime service in the US Army. After the war he became a student of kenpo karate and studied Jeet Kune Do with Bruce Lee, as well as becoming proficient in eight other martial arts disciplines. Melissa Hyams said the slim book "isn't really about martial arts. It's about life and philosophy, and how to turn a negative into a positive, how to defuse a situation by the way you handle it. That's what he'll most be remembered for."

With penologist Tom Murton, he wrote Accomplices to the Crime: The Arkansas Prison Scandal, a 1969 nonfiction account that was the basis for the 1980 film Brubaker starring Robert Redford with supporting roles played by Yaphet Kotto and Morgan Freeman.

In 1991 he wrote the non-fiction work Flight of the Avenger: George Bush at War.

== Personal life ==
Hyams was Jewish and studied Hebrew while attending New York University.

His first marriage was brief and to a nurse he met while serving in World War II. His second marriage was to a model named Ellie.

His third marriage was to 24-year-old actress Elke Sommer in November 1964 in a civil ceremony in Las Vegas. Hyams filed for divorce from Sommer in December 1981. In his December 1981 divorce filing, Hyams claimed that the time he was married to Sommer "were the best 17 years of my life," but that Sommer needed "her independence" in order to be "happy."

Hyams had been a longtime resident of Los Angeles and moved to Penrose, Colorado, three years before his death. He died at age 85 on November 8, 2008, from coronary artery disease at a hospital in Denver, leaving his fourth wife Melissa, two sons, and two daughters.
