= Cooper v. Pate =

- Supreme Court of the United States

Decided June 22, 1964
- Full case name: Cooper v. Pate, warden
- Citations: 378 U.S. 546 (more) 84 S. Ct. 1733; 12 L. Ed. 2d 1030

Case history
- Prior: 324 F.2d 165 (7th Cir. 1963)

Holding
- The judgment by the District Court, stating the lower courts were in error to dismiss the stated cause of action as the petitioner is entitled to have his case heard on its merits, was reverted.

Court membership
- Chief Justice Earl Warren Associate Justices Hugo Black · William O. Douglas; Tom C. Clark · John M. Harlan II; William J. Brennan Jr. · Potter Stewart; Byron White · Arthur Goldberg

Case opinion
- Per curiam

Cooper v. Pate, 378 U.S. 546 (1964), was a U.S. Supreme Court case in which the court ruled for the first time that state prison inmates have the standing to sue in federal court to address their grievances under the Civil Rights Act of 1871. This case followed Jones v. Cunningham (1963) allowing prison inmates to employ a writ of habeas corpus to challenge the legality of their sentencing and the conditions of their imprisonment.

== Background ==
The petitioner, an inmate at the Illinois State Prison, brought a writ of certiorari alleging that solely because he was a Black Muslim he was denied permission to buy religious publications and also denied other privileges accorded other prisoners. The District Court had granted the respondent's motion to dismiss for failure to state a claim for which relief could be granted. The Court of Appeals affirmed.

== Opinion of the Court ==
The Supreme Court reversed the judgment, stating the lower courts were in error to dismiss the stated cause of action as the petitioner is entitled to have his case heard on its merits.

== Significance ==
This case made clear that prison authorities must do whatever is within their ability to treat individuals of every religious group equally, unless they can demonstrate good reasons to do otherwise.

== See also ==
- List of United States Supreme Court cases, volume 378
