= Foman v. Davis =

- Supreme Court of the United States

Argued November 14, 1962 Decided December 3, 1962
- Full case name: Lenore Foman v. Elvira A. Davis
- Citations: 371 U.S. 178 (more) 83 S. Ct. 227; 9 L. Ed. 2d 222; 1962 U.S. LEXIS 65

Case history
- Prior: Judgment affirmed and motions to vacate the judgment and amend the complaint denied by the First Circuit, 292 F.2d 85 (1st Cir. 1961); cert. granted, 368 U.S. 951 (1962)
- Subsequent: Judgment reversed by the First Circuit, 316 F.2d 254 (1963)

Holding
- Rule 15(a) of the Federal Rules of Civil Procedure requires courts to grant a party leave to amend a pleading except in limited circumstances.

Court membership
- Chief Justice Earl Warren Associate Justices Hugo Black · William O. Douglas; Tom C. Clark · John M. Harlan II; William J. Brennan Jr. · Potter Stewart; Byron White · Arthur Goldberg

Case opinions
- Majority: Goldberg, joined by Warren, Black, Douglas, Clark, Brennan, Stewart
- Concur/dissent: Harlan, joined by White

Laws applied
- Fed. R. Civ. P. 15(a)

Foman v. Davis, 371 U.S. 178 (1962), was a case in which the Supreme Court of the United States interpreted Fed. R. Civ. P. 15(a) to require that federal courts grant a party leave to amend a pleading absent special circumstances such as bad faith or prejudice to the opposing party. It has been recognized by both other courts and secondary sources as a leading decision on the interpretation of Rule 15(a).

== Background ==
Foman's father allegedly promised her he would not execute a will in exchange for Foman caring for her mother until her mother's death. After her mother died, Foman's father married Davis, and, contrary to the alleged promise, executed a will leaving his entire estate to Davis. Following her father's death, Foman filed suit against Davis in the District of Massachusetts to recover what would have been her intestate share of her father's estate, that is, the amount she would have gotten had he not executed a will, as he allegedly promised.

Davis moved to dismiss the case, arguing that, under Massachusetts law, an oral promise not to execute a will was within the statute of frauds and thus unenforceable. The district court agreed and dismissed the case. Foman appealed the judgment to the First Circuit. Soon after appealing, though, Foman moved the district court for an order vacating the judgment and granting her leave to amend her complaint to assert a new cause of action for quantum meruit. The district court denied these motions, and Foman appealed this denial to the First Circuit. On appeal, the First Circuit held that it was unable to consider the merits of the case because Foman moved to vacate the judgment subsequent to her first appeal, meaning the judgment was not "final." The First Circuit then upheld the district court's denial of Foman's motions to vacate the judgment and amend her complaint. The Supreme Court agreed to review the case.

== Opinion of the Court ==
Justice Goldberg, writing for the Court, began by holding that the First Circuit was wrong to find that it could not consider the merits of the case because Foman moved to vacate the judgment after filing her initial appeal. Instead, the First Circuit should have considered the merits at the same time as the motions to vacate and amend.

The Court then turned to the First Circuit's denial of Foman's motion to amend her complaint. Under Rule 15(a), federal courts "should freely give leave [to amend] when justice so requires." In the Court's view, this meant that the standard for granting leave to amend was quite liberal: only in very limited circumstances would a denial of leave to amend be justified. Specifically, the Court found that undue delay, bad faith or dilatory motive on the part of the movant, repeated failure to cure deficiencies by previous amendment, prejudice to the opposing party, and futility of amendment would support a denial. Absent such special circumstances, it would be an abuse of discretion for a court to deny leave to amend. The Court granted Foman's motion to amend her complaint and remanded the case to the First Circuit for proceedings consistent with its opinion.

=== Concurrence/Dissent ===
The second Justice Harlan, writing for himself and Justice White, issued a two-sentence opinion concurring in part and dissenting in part. Harlan agreed that the First Circuit should have considered the merits of Foman's case, but he believed the question of whether Foman should have been allowed to amend her complaint was best left to the lower courts.

== Subsequent Developments ==
On remand, the First Circuit considered the merits of Foman's case, as the Supreme Court had directed. It overturned the district court, ruling that under Massachusetts law, an oral promise not to execute a will was not rendered unenforceable by the statute of frauds. Accordingly, the First Circuit had no need to consider Foman's quantum meruit argument.
