= Jackson v. Denno =

- Supreme Court of the United States

Argued December 9–10, 1963 Decided June 22, 1964
- Full case name: Nathan Jackson, Petitioner v. Wilfred Denno, Warden
- Citations: 378 U.S. 368 (more) 84 S. Ct. 1774, 12 L.Ed.2d 908
- Argument: Oral argument

Case history
- Prior: United States v. Denno, 309 F. 2d 573 (2nd Cir. 1962)

Holding
- 1. Under the New York procedure, the trial judge must make a preliminary determination of the voluntariness of a confession and exclude it if in no circumstances could the confession be deemed voluntary.; 2. Petitioner is entitled to a state court hearing on the issue of the voluntariness of the confession by a body other than the one trying his guilt or innocence, but that does not necessarily entitle him to a new trial.

Court membership
- Chief Justice Earl Warren Associate Justices Hugo Black · William O. Douglas; Tom C. Clark · John M. Harlan II; William J. Brennan Jr. · Potter Stewart; Byron White · Arthur Goldberg

Case opinions
- Majority: White, joined by Warren, Black, Douglas, Brennan, Goldberg
- Concur/dissent: Black, joined by Clark (Part I)
- Dissent: Clark
- Dissent: Harlan, joined by Clark, Stewart
- This case overturned a previous ruling or rulings
- Stein v. New York (1953)

Jackson v. Denno, 378 U.S. 368 (1964), was a United States Supreme Court case concerning the process of determining whether a criminal defendant's confession was voluntary or coerced. The case was argued on December 9 and 10, 1963, and decided on June 22, 1964. In a majority opinion authored by Justice Byron White, the Court held that the rule requiring the jury in a criminal trial to determine the voluntariness of a confession, which was in place in New York at the time, was unconstitutional. This decision overruled the Supreme Court's prior decision in Stein v. New York, a 1953 case in which the Court had upheld the same New York rule against a constitutional challenge.
