= David Oshinsky =

American historian (born 1944)

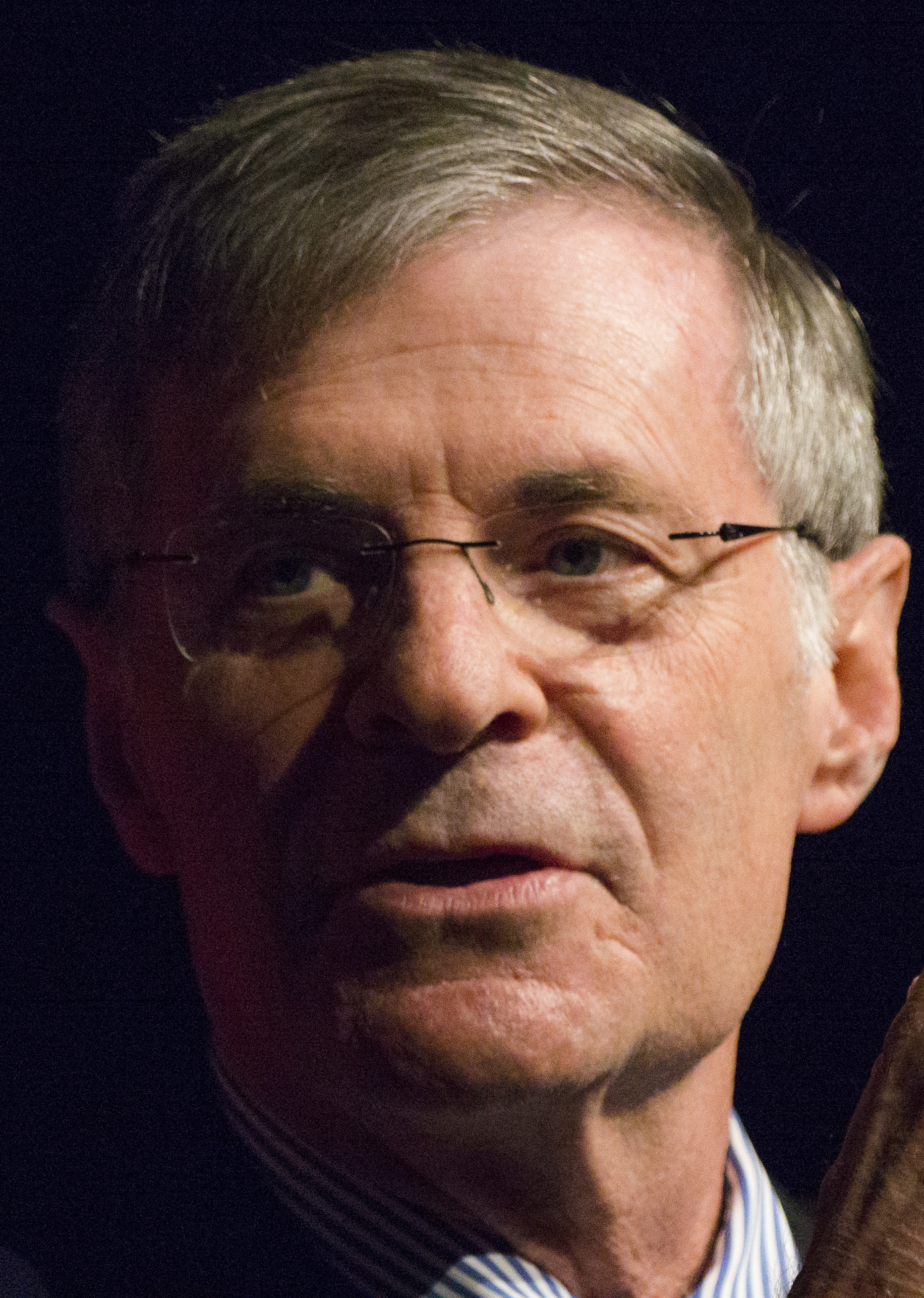
- Oshinsky in December 2016
- Born: 1944 (age 81–82)
- Education: Cornell University (1965); Brandeis University (1971)
- Occupations: Historian, academic
- Writing career
- Notable awards: Pulitzer Prize; 2006

David M. Oshinsky (born 1944) is an American historian, director of the Division of Medical Humanities at the NYU School of Medicine, and a professor in the Department of History at New York University.

== Early life and education ==
Oshinsky graduated from Cornell University in 1965 and obtained his PhD from Brandeis University in 1971.

== Career ==
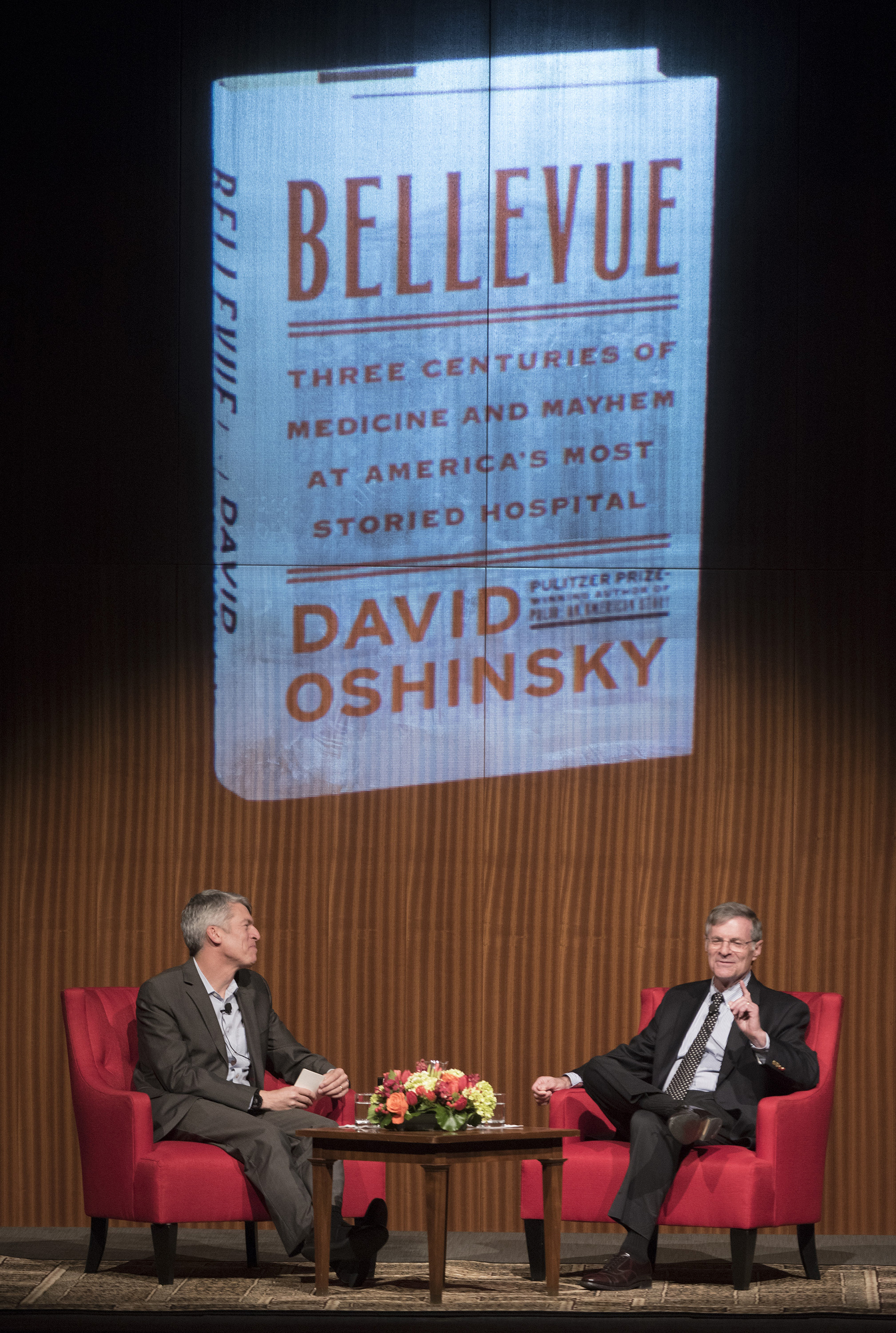
Oshinsky (right) and Dell Medical School dean Clay Johnston (left) at the Lyndon Baines Johnson Library and Museum at the University of Texas at Austin in 2016

Oshinsky won the annual Pulitzer Prize in History for his 2005 book, Polio: An American Story. Oshinsky's most recent book, Bellevue: Three Centuries of Medicine and Mayhem at America’s Most Storied Hospital, was published in 2016. His other books include the D.B. Hardeman Prize-winning A Conspiracy So Immense: The World of Joe McCarthy, and the Robert Kennedy Prize-winning "Worse Than Slavery": Parchman Farm and the Ordeal of Jim Crow Justice. His articles and reviews appear regularly in The New York Times, The Washington Post, and The Chronicle of Higher Education. He previously held the Jack S. Blanton chair in history at the University of Texas at Austin and prior to that he was a professor of history at Rutgers University New Brunswick.

== Bibliography ==
=== Books ===
- Oshinsky, David M. (1976). Senator Joseph McCarthy and the American Labor Movement. University of Missouri Press. ISBN 0-8262-0188-1.
- Oshinsky, David M. (1983). A Conspiracy So Immense: The World of Joe McCarthy. New York: The Free Press. ISBN 0-02-923490-5.
- Oshinsky, David M.; Horn, Daniel; McCormic, Richard Patrick (1989). The Case of the Nazi Professor. Rutgers University Press. ISBN 0-8135-1427-4.
- Oshinsky, David M. (1997). "Worse Than Slavery": Parchman Farm and the Ordeal of Jim Crow. Free Press. ISBN 0-684-83095-7.
- Ayers, Edward L.; Gould. Lewis L.; Oshinsky, David M.; Soderlund, Jean R. (1999). American Passages: A History of the American People, Volume I. Wadsworth Publishing Company. ISBN 0-03-072573-9.
- Ayers, Edward L.; Gould. Lewis L.; Oshinsky, David M.; Soderlund, Jean R. (1999). American Passages: A History of the American People, Volume II. Wadsworth Publishing Company. ISBN 0-03-072574-7.
- Oshinsky, David M. (2005). Polio: An American Story. Oxford University Press, USA. ISBN 0-19-515294-8.
- Oshinsky, David M. (2005) [1983]. A Conspiracy So Immense: The World of Joe McCarthy. Oxford University Press. ISBN 0-19-515424-X.
- Oshinsky, David M. (2010). Capital Punishment on Trial: Furman v. Georgia and the Death Penalty in Modern America.
- Oshinsky, David M. (2016). Bellevue: Three Centuries of Medicine and Mayhem at America's Most Storied Hospital. Doubleday. ISBN 978-0385523363.

=== Selected articles ===
- Oshinsky, David M. (September 15, 1991). "The Senior G-Man David M. Oshinsky is a professor of history at Rutgers University and the author of "A Conspiracy So Immense: The World of Joe McCarthy."". The New York Times.
- Oshinsky, David M. (December 30, 2007). "Heil Woodrow!". The New York Times.
- Oshinsky, David M. (January 27, 2008). "In the Heart of the Heart of Conspiracy". The New York Times.
- Oshinsky, David, "Vaccines at Warp Speed" (review of Thomas R. Cech, The Catalyst: RNA and the Quest to Unlock Life's Deepest Secrets, Norton, 2024, 292 pp.), The New York Review of Books, vol. LXXII, no. 5 (27 March 2025), pp. 48–50. In order to create COVID-19 vaccines "[t]here was no need, as with earlier vaccines, to grow, attenuate, and purify large amounts of virus – in this case SARS-CoV-2 – ... because the vaccine no longer contains it. Instead, synthetic mRNA instructs the cells to create a harmless fragment of SARS-CoV-2 that will trigger the immune system to recognize and destroy the virus... [T]he body becomes the factory." (p. 49.) The success of the COVID-19 vaccines "recast the importance of RNA.... [I]t is almost a given, as [the book's author] Cech makes clear, that RNA will power the next generation of pharmaceuticals, which will move beyond infectious diseases to those caused by a 'missing or mutated protein,' such as muscular dystrophy, and numerous cancers caused by 'normal cellular processes gone awry.'... [The question arises, however:] Will this growing focus on 'disease-driven research' overshadow the more traditional 'curiosity-driven' research so vital to scientific advancement?" (p. 50.)

== See also ==
- Jim Crow laws
