= Gates v. Collier =

- Court: United States Court of Appeals for the Fifth Circuit
- Full case name: Nazareth Gates et al v. John Colliers, Superintendent, Mississippi State Penitentiary, et al
- Decided: September 20, 1974
- Citation: 501 F.2d 1291 (

Case history
- Prior history: 349 F. Supp. 881 (N.D. Miss. 1972); 371 F. Supp. 1368 (1973)

Court membership
- Judges sitting: Elbert Tuttle, Griffin Bell, Irving Loeb Goldberg

Case opinions
- Majority: Tuttle

Laws applied
- Eighth Amendment

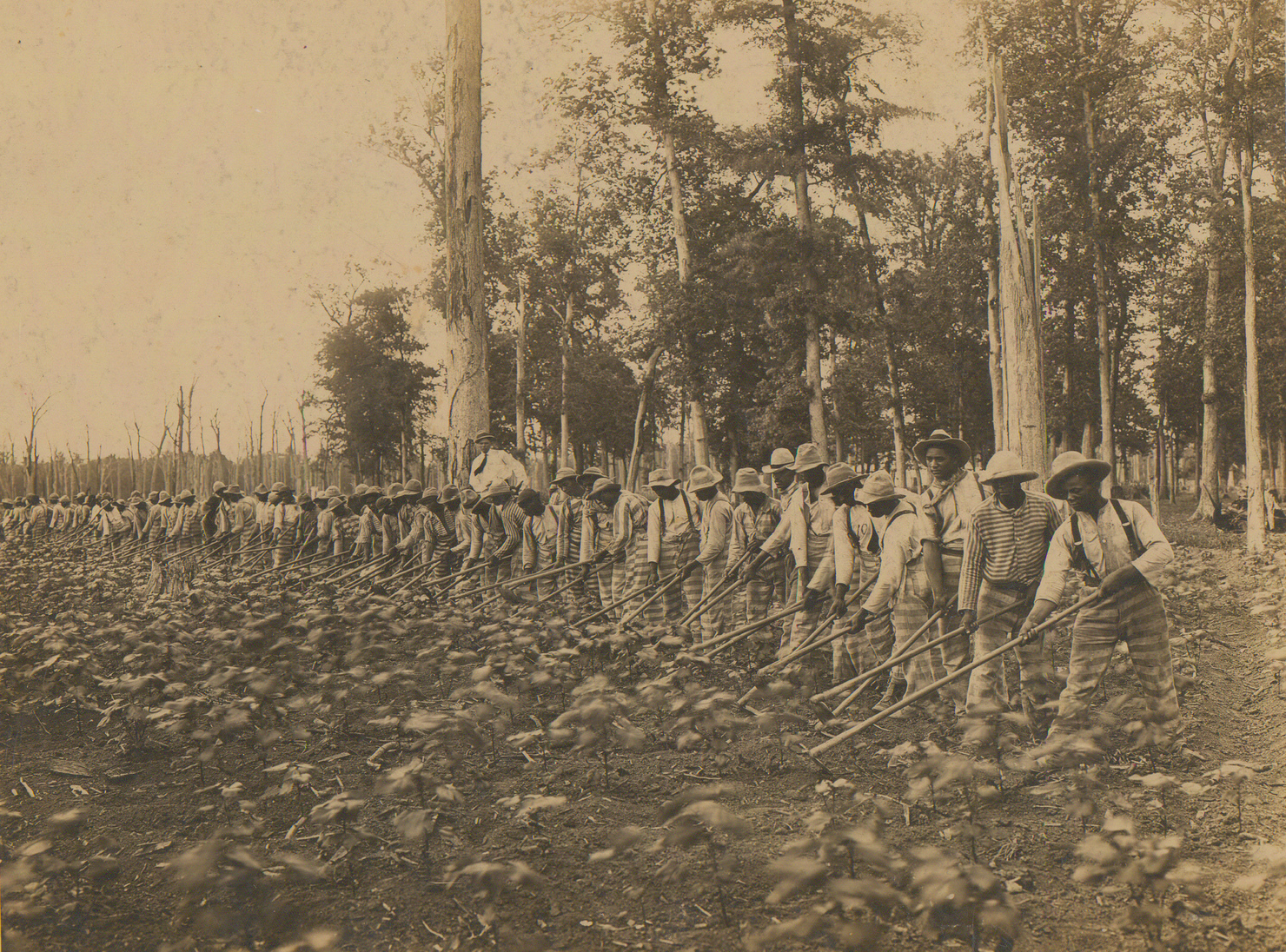
Prison labor under the trusty system

Gates v. Collier, 501 F.2d 1291 (5th Cir. 1974), was a landmark decision of the Fifth Circuit Court of Appeals that brought an end to the trusty system as well as flagrant inmate abuse at Mississippi State Penitentiary, also known as Parchman Farm, in Sunflower County, Mississippi. It was the first case in a body of law developed in the Fifth Circuit Court of Appeals holding that a variety of forms of corporal punishment against prisoners constituted cruel and unusual punishment and a violation of Eighth Amendment rights. This case was also the first broad-scale intervention by a court in the supervision of prison practices.

In Gates v. Collier, the Court of Appeals found certain forms of corporal punishment violate the Eighth Amendment, including "handcuffing inmates to the fence and to cells for long periods of time, ... and forcing inmates to stand, sit or lie on crates, stumps, or otherwise maintain awkward positions for prolonged periods."

== Parchman Farm ==
The Mississippi State Penitentiary, commonly known as Parchman Farm, was founded in 1904 and consisted of 20,000 acres of delta. The prison was styled after plantations, emerging in the South during the Jim Crow era. It's estimated that throughout its history, about 90% of Parchman's prisoners were black men.

After the Civil War, Mississippi was still dependent upon black labor to sustain its farms and plantations. As a result, the state passed a series of laws that made vagrancy a crime; African Americans had to constantly carry papers around showing proof of employment, and if they were found without documentation they would be arrested. Pig laws also played a role in the convictions of many Parchman Farm inmates. Pig laws made any kind of minor larceny a serious crime, for stealing something like a soda would typically result in five years of jail. Convict leasing was another discriminatory system used in which African Americans would be leased to do work rather than sent to jail, essentially taking the place of slavery.

Parchman Farm had black camps that were overseen by a white sergeant. Below the white sergeant were black trusties, who had been convicted of murder and allowed to carry a gun. The state rationalized this system economically, for hiring inmates to carry out duties rather than civilian guards meant money was being saved.

"The Penitentiary Board at the time was composed of 5 individuals appointed by the Governor with consent of the Senate for 4-year terms, appointed the superintendent, who was vested with exclusive management and control of the prison system in all aspects, including the care and treatment of inmates and the hiring, control and discharge of 150 civilian employees".

Oshinsky, the author of Worse than Slavery, once stated in an interview with The Washington Post that "Parchman Farm was basically the leading cash cow for the state of Mississippi." They were adding hundreds of thousands of dollars and then millions of dollars to the state treasury, and thus were a huge economic asset".

== Roy Haber ==
In 1970, Roy Haber, a civil rights lawyer, was recruited along with other lawyers to "bring some law and order to the South".

Haber first came to Parchman in 1970 after quitting his New York City divorce practice to speak with Matthew Winter, a prisoner who had been convicted of murder. Haber's initial visit to Parchman was made in order to determine whether or not Winter had been adequately represented in court. After his first meeting with Haber, Winter was threatened and beaten by trusties.

Haber took statements from Parchman inmates about conditions at the prison, which was not easy at first; many prisoners were afraid of facing retribution from prison officials.

Some of his most "damning" evidence included a document that ran over fifty single-spaced pages with a list of murders, rapes, beatings, and tortures at Parchman between 1969 and 1971.

== Racial discrimination and inmate abuse ==
At Parchman Farm, punishments up until the 1970s were representative of slavery. "The prisoners were housed in large barracks that were rundown and filthy, with 100–120 in one room". Each camp had open ditches that held raw sewage and medical waste. When Judge Keady of the District Court Case visited Parchman on multiple occasions, he witnessed "filthy bathrooms, rotting mattresses, polluted water supplies, and kitchens overrun with insects, rodents, and the stench of decay." Parchman was known to be dangerous and deadly. Aside from its inhumane conditions, shootings and beatings were carried out regularly, murders failed to be documented and the maximum-security unit was a torture chamber.

Allegations of abuse between 1969 and 1971 include:

- Bogard, William: compelled to stand in the daytime and sit at night for three entire days without interruption on a coke crate.
- Collins, Matthew: murdered by trusty J.C. Dunnican on order of Ollis Hitt.
- Goodwin, Frank: "jumped on" and had an ear ripped off by inmate Danny Williamson.
- Hayes, Jessie: shot by trusty John Horn for refusal to engage in homosexual acts.
- Humes, George: handcuffed to bars, on tiptoes for two days without food, water, or bathroom facilities.
- Marino, Hilliard: hair cut and pulled out while forced to kneel on the concrete floor, assaulted with others in MSU with brass knuckles, causing blindness and constant pain.
- Nathan, Walter: handcuffed and hanged from tree.
- Tackett, Bob: another inmate named Cantrell kicked out one of his eyes which was lost; that he was beaten by a trusty.
- Waldie, Donald: required to maintain a mid-suspended position which one assumes during course of doing push-ups, and at that time was guarded by J.D. Gilmer, who shot above or below him if he moved.
- Wells, William: fatally shot by Sgt. West.
- Williams, Jessie: fatally shot by Walter Griffin, a trusty, on orders of Obar, the driver of the vehicle.

== District court case ==
On February 8, 1971, Nazareth Gates, Willie Holmes, Matthew Winter, and Hal Zachary filed a class action against the Superintendent of the Penitentiary, the members of the Mississippi Penitentiary Board and the Governor of the State. "The plaintiffs charged that 'deplorable conditions and practices' at Parchman deprived them of rights guaranteed by the First, Eighth, Thirteenth, and Fourteenth amendments to the United States Constitution."

Thomas D. Cook was the penitentiary superintendent accused of committing the actions, and was replaced in February 1972 by John Collier, who was substituted and appointed in his stead as a defendant.

"28 U.S.C. §§ 1331 and 1343, the plaintiffs allege that the defendants, by their methods of prison administration, have deprived the inmates of rights, privileges and immunities secured to them by the First, Eighth, Thirteenth and Fourteenth Amendments and by 42 U.S.C. §§ 1981, 1983, 1985 and 1994. The complaint stated that African American inmates had been segregated and discriminated against based on their race, which is a violation of the Equal Protection Clause of the Fourteenth Amendment. The complaint aimed for injunctive relief to remedy the alleged misconduct of the defendants and a declaratory judgment that the continuation of certain practices and conditions at the penitentiary is unconstitutional".

According to a section of the Preliminary Statement, "On August 23, 1971, the United States was allowed to intervene as plaintiff pursuant to 42 U.S.C. § 2000h-2.[2] The complaint in intervention alleges that the defendants have, contrary to the Fourteenth Amendment, maintained a system of prison facilities segregated by race; and, additionally, the defendants have failed to provide the inmates with adequate housing, medical care, and protection from assault from other prisoners; that the conditions of the sewerage disposal and water systems create an immediate health hazard, and that prison officials have permitted the custodial staff, including inadequately trained armed trusties, to inflict cruel and unusual punishment upon inmates in violation of the Eighth Amendment. The United States seeks injunctive relief to remedy the alleged misconduct of defendants".

In October 1972, Judge William Keady found for the plaintiffs, calling Parchman Farm an "affront to modern standards of decency" and its living quarters "unfit for human habitation." He ordered an end to all unconstitutional conditions and practices.

== Fifth Circuit decision ==
The state of Mississippi appealed this decision to the Fifth Circuit Court of Appeals, though the Fifth Circuit ended up agreeing with the lower court's earlier decision. Racial segregation of inmates was abolished as well as the trusty system.

Subsequently, other states utilizing the trusty system, such as Arkansas, Alabama, Louisiana and Texas were also forced to abolish it under the Gates v. Collier rulings.

== See also ==
- Louisiana State Penitentiary
- Cummins Unit - Arkansas and Texas
- Pervear v. Massachusetts
- Holt v. Sarver
- Ruiz v. Estelle - Texas
- Hope v. Pelzer
