= Polio: An American Story =

2005 book by David M. Oshinsky

- Author: David M. Oshinsky
- Genre: Non-fiction
- Publisher: Oxford University Press
- Publication date: 2005
- Pages: 342
- ISBN: 0-19-515294-8

Polio: An American Story by David M. Oshinsky, professor of history at the University of Texas at Austin, documents the polio epidemic in the United States during the 1940s and 1950s and the race to develop a vaccine, which led to 2 different types of polio vaccine: inactivated poliovirus vaccine, developed by a team led by Jonas Salk, and oral poliovirus vaccine, developed by a team led by Albert Sabin.

Published in 2005 by the Oxford University Press, it won the 2006 Pulitzer Prize for History and the 2005 Herbert Hoover Book Award.

== Contents ==
Oshinky tells the story of the terror that polio outbreaks caused in suburban America, and details the role of key players, including President Franklin D. Roosevelt, who was diagnosed with polio in 1921 (or potentially misdiagnosed, see List of polio survivors), and the National Foundation for Infantile Paralysis (now the March of Dimes), which collected dimes from Americans to support research. The story highlights the fierce competition and rivalry between Salk and Sabin, the contributions of other scientists including Isabel Morgan, and how the American experience with early polio vaccine use led to the development of regulatory processes for testing of vaccines and other drugs as part of US government licensing and for managing liability claims in the American legal system.

== Evaluations ==
According to reviewer Janet Greenlees:

In an extremely readable narrative, David Oshinsky tells a gripping story about the widespread fear of poliomyelitis in mid-twentieth-century America and the race to find a cure, over a period from the early publicity about Franklin Delano Roosevelt's struggle with the disease, to the March of Dimes campaigns, to the development of the two vaccines by Salk and Sabin. The author draws primarily on the recently released papers of Jonas Salk and Albert Sabin, the two leading researchers for a cure, but also incorporates the stories of other key scientists including Thomas Francis and Isabel Morgan. Morgan is portrayed as the most talented of all the polio researchers who might well have beaten the men to a cure if she had not left science to look after a family.
