= Junction City Prison =

Prison in Ohio, United States

- Interactive map of Junction City Prison
- Location: Jackson Township, Perry County, near Junction City, Ohio; 39.732°N 82.338°W
- Status: Closed
- Security class: Medium security
- Opened: 1913

Junction City Prison was located at the intersection of S Adcock Road and Pen Road NW near Junction City, Ohio.

== History ==
Originally the site of a brick plant, the State of Ohio purchased the property in 1913 to be used as a satellite prison for the Ohio Penitentiary in Columbus, Ohio, for the care of aged and disabled prisoners. But on September 2, 1927 guard Grant Weakly was shot and killed during an escape attempt while escorting prisoners to the dentist office. The escapees Patrick Riley and Fred Kellogg were apprehended in nearby New Lexington, Ohio.

In 1928, prisoners rebuilt the main wing in brick after the original building burned down. Between 1935 and 1938 the prison was closed while a third floor was added to the main cellblock. An educational wing was added in 1970. On January 7, 1974, two prisoners took three women hostage at knife-point. After several hours, the stand-off was ended when 28 Ohio State Highway officers rushed the room. One inmate was killed and the other was injured.

Ohio State authorities closed the prison permanently in 1977.

== After closure ==
The prison was purchased by Nepco for use as a gasohol refinery. The prison drama Brubaker (1980) starring Robert Redford was filmed within the former prison buildings. In the early 1990s, Perry County Pizza took over the educational wing of the old prison to make frozen pizza kits for school fundraisers. The entire Junction City Prison was demolished in the spring of 2005.
