= Murphy v. Waterfront Commission =

Murphy v. Waterfront Commission of New York Harbor
- Supreme Court of the United States

Argued March 5, 1964 Decided June 15, 1964
- Full case name: Murphy v. Waterfront Commission of New York Harbor
- Citations: 378 U.S. 52 (more) 84 S. Ct. 1594 (1964); 12 L. Ed. 2d 678
- Argument: Oral argument

Case history
- Prior: In re Waterfront Comm'n of N.Y. Harbor, 171 A.2d 295 (N.J. 1961); cert. denied, 368 U.S. 32 (1961); 189 A.2d 36 (N.J. 1963); cert. granted, 375 U.S. 812 (1963).

Holding
- The right against self-incrimination is not precluded by the grant of immunity from prosecution under state laws, when the testimony might be incriminating under the laws of another jurisdiction.

Court membership
- Chief Justice Earl Warren Associate Justices Hugo Black · William O. Douglas; Tom C. Clark · John M. Harlan II; William J. Brennan Jr. · Potter Stewart; Byron White · Arthur Goldberg

Case opinions
- Majority: Goldberg, joined by unanimous
- Concurrence: Black
- Concurrence: Harlan, joined by Clark
- Concurrence: White, joined by Stewart

Laws applied
- U.S. Const. amend. V, U.S. Const. amend. XIV
- This case overturned a previous ruling or rulings
- United States v. Murdock, 284 U.S. 389 (1931); Knapp v. Schweitzer, 357 U.S. 371 (1958)

Murphy v. Waterfront Commission of New York Harbor, 378 U.S. 52 (1964), was a United States Supreme Court case concerning the self-incrimination clause in the Fifth Amendment to the United States Constitution. The Court ruled that a state cannot compel a witness to provide testimony that may be incriminating under other State/Federal laws, even if it granted immunity under its own laws. Decided on the same day as Malloy v. Hogan (1964), the Supreme Court reconsidered its previous rulings that the Federal Government could compel witness testimony that could be incriminating under a state's laws, and states could similarly compel testimony that would be incriminating under Federal law.

== Background ==
The Waterfront Commission of New York Harbor is a bi-state agency tasked to investigate and aid prosecution of criminal activity in the Port of New York and New Jersey. While investigating work stoppage activity suspected to be in violation of the Waterfront Commission Act, it subpoenaed petitioners asking them to testify about the striking activity under investigation. Petitioners were granted immunity from prosecution under New York and New Jersey laws pursuant to New Jersey law, but they refused to testify beyond their names and union membership status, claiming that the immunity did not protect them from federal prosecution. They were held in civil and criminal contempt by the Law Division of the New Jersey Superior Court. The criminal contempt charges were reversed on appeal to the Supreme Court of New Jersey, while the civil contempt charges were remanded for a new trial. Petitioners appealed to the United States Supreme Court, arguing that the contempt charges were in violation of the Fifth Amendment.

== See also ==
- List of United States Supreme Court cases, volume 378
