= D. B. Hardeman Prize =

U.S. Congress-related book award

The D. B. Hardeman Prize is a cash prize awarded annually by the Lyndon Baines Johnson Foundation for the best book that furthers the study of the U.S. Congress in the fields of biography, history, journalism, or political science. Submissions are judged on the basis of five criteria: (1) contribution to scholarship, (2) contribution to the public's understanding of Congress, (3) literary craftsmanship, (4) originality, and (5) depth of research. Members of the national selection committee are: Senator Tom Daschle; Lee Hamilton, Director of The Center on Congress; Thomas Mann of The Brookings Institution; Leslie Sanchez of Impacto Group; and Nancy Beck Young of The University of Houston.

D. Barnard Hardeman, Jr. (1914–1981) was a politician, political scholar, journalist and teacher. He graduated from the University of Texas and the University of Texas Law School and served in the U.S. Army during World War II. Hardeman served in the 52nd and 54th Legislatures representing Grayson and Collin counties in the Texas House of Representatives. Between 1958 and 1961, he worked as an assistant to Sam Rayburn, Speaker of the House, and was Rayburn's official biographer. An avid bibliophile whose book collection numbered more than ten thousand volumes, Hardeman bequeathed his collection of American biographies and political history to the LBJ Presidential Library in Austin, Texas.

== Recipients ==
#	Year	Author	Title	Publisher
01	1980	Richard F. Fenno Jr.	Home Style: House Members in Their Districts	Little, Brown and Company
02	1982	Allen Schick	Congress and Money: Budgeting, Spending and Taxing	The Urban Institute
03	1984	James L. Sundquist	The Decline and Resurgence of Congress	Brookings Institution Press
04	1986	David Oshinsky	A Conspiracy So Immense: The World of Joe McCarthy	The Free Press
05	1988	Paul Light	Artful Work: The Politics of Social Security Reform	Random House
06	1990	Christopher H. Foreman, Jr.	Signals From the Hill: Congressional Oversight and the Challenge of Social Regulation	Yale University Press
07	1992	Barbara Sinclair	The Transformation of the U.S. Senate	The Johns Hopkins University Press
08	1994	Gilbert C. Fite	Richard B. Russell, Jr., Senator From Georgia	The University of North Carolina Press
09	1995	Carol M. Swain	Black Faces, Black Interests: The Representation of African Americans in Congress	Harvard University Press
10	1995	John Jacobs	A Rage for Justice: The Passion and Politics of Phillip Burton	University of California Press
11	1996	William Lee Miller	Arguing About Slavery: The Great Battle in the United States Congress	Alfred A. Knopf
12	1997	Robert V. Remini	Daniel Webster: The Man and His Time	W. W. Norton and Company
13	1998	Julian E. Zelizer	Taxing America: Wilbur D. Mills, Congress, and the State, 1945–1975	Cambridge University Press
14	1999	Frances E. Lee and Bruce I. Oppenheimer	Sizing Up the Senate: The Unequal Consequences of Equal Representation	The University of Chicago Press
15	2000	Nancy Beck Young	Wright Patman: Populism, Liberalism, & the American Dream	Southern Methodist University Press
16	2001	John Aloysius Farrell	Tip O’Neill and the American Century	Little, Brown and Company
17	2002	Robert Caro	The Years of Lyndon Johnson: Master of the Senate	Random House
18	2003	Don Oberdorfer	Senator Mansfield: The Extraordinary Life of a Great American Statesman and Diplomat	Smithsonian Books
19	2004	Michael J. Ybarra	Washington Gone Crazy: Senator Pat McCarran and the Great American Communist Hunt	Steerforth Press
20	2005	David M. Barrett	The CIA and Congress: The Untold Story from Truman to Kennedy	University Press of Kansas
21	2006	Robert David Johnson	Congress and the Cold War	Cambridge University Press
22	2007	William G. Howell and Jon C. Pevehouse	While Dangers Gather: Congressional Checks on Presidential War Powers	Princeton University Press
23	2008	Keith Finley	Delaying the Dream: Southern Senators and the Fight against Civil Rights, 1938–1965	Louisiana State University Press
24	2009	Frances E. Lee	Beyond Ideology: Politics, Principles, and Partisanship in the U.S. Senate	The University of Chicago Press
25	2013	Douglas L. Kriner	After the Rubicon: Congress, Presidents, and the Politics of Waging War	The University of Chicago Press
26	2014	Eric S. Heberlig and Bruce A. Larson	Congressional Parties, Institutional Ambition, and the Financing of Majority Control	The University of Michigan Press
27	2015	Neil MacNeil and Richard A. Baker	The American Senate: An Insider’s Guide	Oxford University Press
28	2016	Rebecca U. Thorpe	The American Warfare State: The Domestic Politics of Military Spending	The University of Chicago Press
29	2018	Julian E. Zelizer	The Fierce Urgency of Now: Lyndon Johnson, Congress, and the Battle for the Great Society	Penguin Press
30	2019	Fergus M. Bordewich	The First Congress: How James Madison, George Washington, and a Group of Extraordinary Men Invented the Government	Simon & Schuster
31	2020	Ruth Bloch Rubin	Building the Bloc: Intraparty Organization in the U.S. Congress	Cambridge University Press
32	2021	David Bateman, Ira Katznelson and John Lapinski	Southern Nation: Congress and White Supremacy after Reconstruction	Princeton University Press
