= A Conspiracy So Immense =

Book by David Oshinsky

- Author: David Oshinsky
- Subject: Joseph McCarthy
- Genre: Biography
- Publisher: Free Press
- Publication date: 1983
- ISBN: 9780029234907
- Dewey Decimal: 973.9180924
- LC Class: E748.M143 O82

A Conspiracy So Immense: The World of Joe McCarthy is a Hardeman Prize-winning book by David Oshinsky first published in 1983 by Free Press and later reprinted by Oxford University Press. The book covers the life of Joseph McCarthy from his birth to his death.
