= List of United States Supreme Court cases, volume 378 =

This is a list of all the United States Supreme Court cases from volume 378 of the United States Reports:

Case name	Citation	Date decided
Malloy v. Hogan	378 U.S. 1	1964
United States v. Boyd	378 U.S. 39	1964
Murphy v. Waterfront Commission	378 U.S. 52	1964
Aguilar v. Texas	378 U.S. 108	1964
Viking Theatre Corp. v. Paramount Film Distributing Corp.	378 U.S. 123	1964
Dept. of Alcoholic Beverage Control v. Ammex Warehouse Co.	378 U.S. 124	1964
Mitchell Bros. Truck Lines v. United States	378 U.S. 125	1964
Dunne Leases Cars & Trucks, Inc. v. Lussier	378 U.S. 125	1964
Benko v. Hartford Accident & Indemnity Co.	378 U.S. 126	1964
Elfbrandt v. Russell	378 U.S. 127	1964
Curtis, Inc. v. United States	378 U.S. 128	1964
Zoumah v. United States	378 U.S. 129	1964
Griffin v. Maryland	378 U.S. 130	1964
Fallen v. United States	378 U.S. 139	1964
Barr v. City of Columbia	378 U.S. 146	1964
Robinson v. Florida	378 U.S. 153	1964
United States v. Penn-Olin Chemical Co.	378 U.S. 158	1964
Jacobellis v. Ohio	378 U.S. 184	1964
Quantity of Books v. Kansas	378 U.S. 205	1964
Bell v. Maryland	378 U.S. 226	1964
Bouie v. City of Columbia	378 U.S. 347	1964
Jackson v. Denno	378 U.S. 368	1964
United States v. Cont'l Can Co.	378 U.S. 441	1964
Escobedo v. Illinois	378 U.S. 478	1964
Aptheker v. Secretary of State	378 U.S. 500	1964
Berman v. United States	378 U.S. 530	1964
Dresner v. City of Tallahassee	378 U.S. 539	1964
Aldrich v. Aldrich	378 U.S. 540	1964
Leonard v. United States	378 U.S. 544	1964
Cooper v. Pate	378 U.S. 546	1964
Drews v. Maryland	378 U.S. 547	1964
Williams v. North Carolina (1964)	378 U.S. 548	1964
Rogers v. United States	378 U.S. 549	1964
Green v. Virginia	378 U.S. 550	1964
Mitchell v. City of Charleston	378 U.S. 551	1964
Harris v. Virginia	378 U.S. 552	1964
Swann v. Adams	378 U.S. 553	1964
Meyers v. Thigpen	378 U.S. 554	1964
Lucas v. Adams	378 U.S. 555	1964
Nolan v. Rhodes	378 U.S. 556	1964
West v. Carr	378 U.S. 557	1964
Glass v. Hancock Cnty. Election Comm'n	378 U.S. 558	1964
Williams v. Moss	378 U.S. 558	1964
Germano v. Kerner	378 U.S. 560	1964
Marshall v. Hare	378 U.S. 561	1964
Franklin v. Butterworth	378 U.S. 562	1964
Senk v. Pennsylvania	378 U.S. 562	1964
Hearne v. Smylie	378 U.S. 563	1964
Pinney v. Butterworth	378 U.S. 564	1964
Hill v. Davis	378 U.S. 565	1964
Lathan v. New York	378 U.S. 566	1964
Lopez v. Texas	378 U.S. 567	1964
Oister v. Pennsylvania	378 U.S. 568	1964
Muschette v. United States	378 U.S. 569	1964
Del Hoyo v. New York	378 U.S. 570	1964
Pea v. United States	378 U.S. 571	1964
Harris v. Texas	378 U.S. 572	1964
Catanzaro v. New York	378 U.S. 573	1964
Owen v. Arizona	378 U.S. 574	1964
McNerlin v. Denno	378 U.S. 575	1964
Tralins v. Gerstein	378 U.S. 576	1964
Grove Press, Inc. v. Gerstein	378 U.S. 577	1964
Fried v. New York	378 U.S. 578	1964
Mayer v. Rusk	378 U.S. 579	1964
Inland Empire Builders, Inc. v. Washington	378 U.S. 580	1964
Bob Jones Univ. v. Greenville	378 U.S. 581	1964
Texas Co. (P. R.) Inc. v. Sec'y of Treasury	378 U.S. 581	1964
McLeod v. Ohio	378 U.S. 582	1964
Blair v. Ohio	378 U.S. 582	1964
Hudson County News Co. v. Sills	378 U.S. 583	1964
Smith v. Crouse	378 U.S. 584	1964
Ruark v. Colorado	378 U.S. 585	1964
Peoples v. United States	378 U.S. 586	1964
Fox v. North Carolina	378 U.S. 587	1964
Copeland v. Sec'y of State	378 U.S. 588	1964
Etchieson v. Texas	378 U.S. 589	1964
