= David M. Barrett =

American political scientist (born c. 1951)

David M. Barrett (born c. 1951) is a professor of political science at Villanova University. Since 2014, he has been writing a history of President Kennedy and the Central Intelligence Agency. He has authored (along with Max Holland) of "Blind Over Cuba: The Photo Gap and the Missile Crisis" (2012), "The CIA and Congress: The Untold Story from Truman to Kennedy" (2005), Lyndon B. Johnson's Vietnam Papers (1997), and Uncertain Warriors: Lyndon Johnson and His Vietnam Advisers (1993). The CIA and Congress: The Untold Story from Truman to Kennedy won the D. B. Hardeman Prize in 2005. A former radio and television journalist, Barrett unsuccessfully sought election in Indiana to the U.S. House of Representatives in 1984.

== Education ==
Barrett graduated from Wylie (Texas) High School in 1969. He received his B.A. degree in American studies from the University of Notre Dame in 1973, his M.A. in political science from the University of Essex (England) in 1986, and his Ph.D. in political science from the University of Notre Dame in 1990.

== Research ==
In 2005, Barrett discovered a volume of the CIA's internal history titled "Official History of the Bay of Pigs Operation, Volume III: Evolution of CIA's Anti-Castro Policies, 1951- January 1961". This volume had been declassified in 1998 under the 1992 Kennedy Assassination Records Act. Among other revelations, Barrett learned via the volume that the head of the CIA had met prior to the Bay of Pigs project with a variety of corporate leaders whose companies had large investments in Cuba. Barrett says that he found the volume in a box labelled 'CIA Miscellaneous' while doing archival research at the National Archives. As of 2016, one of the five volumes of the history remained classified. By that year, as part of his research for a book on the interactions between the Kennedy White House and the CIA, Barrett had submitted three Freedom of Information Requests to the CIA requesting the volume. The CIA had not at that point released the volume.

Barrett teaches classes related to U.S. Intelligence agencies, National Security Policy, the U.S. Presidency, and a Senior Seminar on the U. S. Presidency and the Vietnam War.
