= Jones v. Cunningham =

- Supreme Court of the United States

Argued December 3, 1962 Decided January 14, 1963
- Full case name: Jones v. Cunningham
- Citations: 371 U.S. 236 (more) 83 S. Ct. 373; 9 L. Ed. 2d 285; 1963 U.S. LEXIS 2261

Case history
- Prior: 297 F.2d 851 (4th Cir. 1962); 313 F.2d 347 (4th Cir. 1963)

Holding
- A state prisoner who has been placed on parole, under the "custody and control" of a parole board, is "in custody" within the meaning of 28 U.S.C. § 2241; and, on his petition for a writ of habeas corpus, a Federal District Court has jurisdiction to hear and determine his charge that his state sentence was imposed in violation of the Federal Constitution.

Court membership
- Chief Justice Earl Warren Associate Justices Hugo Black · William O. Douglas; Tom C. Clark · John M. Harlan II; William J. Brennan Jr. · Potter Stewart; Byron White · Arthur Goldberg

Case opinion
- Majority: Black, joined by unanimous

Laws applied
- 28 USC 2241-2255 (habeas corpus)
- This case overturned a previous ruling or rulings
- Pervear v. Massachusetts (1867)

Jones v. Cunningham, 371 U.S. 236 (1963), was a Supreme Court case in which the court first ruled that state inmates had the right to file a writ of habeas corpus challenging both the legality and the conditions of their imprisonment. Prior to this, starting with Pervear v. Massachusetts, 72 U.S. 475 (1866), the court had maintained a "hands off" policy regarding federal interference with state incarceration policies and practices, maintaining that the Bill of Rights did not apply to the states. Subsequently, in Cooper v. Pate (1964), an inmate successfully obtained standing to challenge the denial of his right to practice his religion through a habeas corpus writ.
