= "Worse than Slavery" =

1996 book by David M. Oshinsky

"Worse than Slavery": Parchman Farm and the Ordeal of Jim Crow Justice is a 1996 book by David M. Oshinsky, published by The Free Press. It is about Mississippi State Penitentiary in Sunflower County, Mississippi.

== Sourcing ==
The sourcing includes documents from the prison and from plantations, interviews, and some works described by James Goodman of The New Leader as "long forgotten" and "invaluable".

== Contents ==
The introduction describes Mississippi before the U.S. Civil War. The book then describes the end of slavery and Jim Crow. The content about the prison begins about the midway point of the book.

The book has the lyrics of prison-related songs.

At times the book's text describes the state of events circa 1996 and it has tangents on other subjects.

James McPherson of The New York Times stated that the book demonstrated that prisoner life "was very much like slavery" though it "is not clear" whether the book demonstrates that prison life was harsher than slavery.

== Reception ==
Goodman described the book as "timely". Goodman stated that it "reads like a quietly powerful piece of music, less blues than jazz".

McPherson described the book as "vigorous, hard-hitting". McPherson argued that the chapter describing the prisoners' lives in the 1904-1930 period was the "best" one.

Brad Hooper, in Booklist, stated that the book is "rigorous" and "should be accorded an important place on the u.s. history shelf." Hooper stated that the history of Parchman was "a horror story".

Adolf Reed Jr., in The Nation stated that the work is "an especially welcome reminder" of past race relations that Reed argued would be undesirable to return to.

== See also ==
- Down on Parchman Farm - A 1999 book on Parchman
