= List of United States Supreme Court cases, volume 371 =

This is a list of all the United States Supreme Court cases from volume 371 of the United States Reports:

Case name	Citation	Date decided
Honeywood v. Rockefeller	371 U.S. 1	1962
Bel Oil Corp. v. Cocreham	371 U.S. 2	1962
United States v. Brown (1962)	371 U.S. 2	1962
Ragan v. City of Seattle	371 U.S. 3	1962
Errington v. Missouri	371 U.S. 3	1962
Cannata v. New York	371 U.S. 4	1962
Waxman v. Virginia	371 U.S. 4	1962
Fairview Pub. Util. Dist. v. City of Anchorage	371 U.S. 5	1962
Fulghum v. Louisiana	371 U.S. 5	1962
Atlantic Coast Line R. Co. v. United States	371 U.S. 6	1962
Poindexter v. McGee	371 U.S. 6	1962
Harris v. Florida Real Estate Comm'n	371 U.S. 7	1962
Readey v. St. Louis Cnty. Water Co.	371 U.S. 8	1962
Georgia v. United States	371 U.S. 9	1962
Lassiter v. United States	371 U.S. 10	1962
Wellens v. Dillon	371 U.S. 11	1962
United States v. Woodson	371 U.S. 12	1962
Household Fin. Corp. v. Division of Taxation	371 U.S. 13	1962
Carr v. New York	371 U.S. 14	1962
Barton v. District Ct.	371 U.S. 15	1962
Fleischer v. W.P.I.X., Inc.	371 U.S. 16	1962
Paccione v. Heritage	371 U.S. 17	1962
United States v. Haley	371 U.S. 18	1962
United States v. Department of Revenue	371 U.S. 21	1962
Southeastern Aviation, Inc. v. Hurd	371 U.S. 21	1962
Peerless Stages, Inc. v. United States	371 U.S. 22	1962
Pulley v. Pulley	371 U.S. 22	1962
Wasserman v. University of N.Y.	371 U.S. 23	1962
Miller v. Lake	371 U.S. 23	1962
Utah Pharm. Ass'n v. United States	371 U.S. 24	1962
Davidson v. LaVallee	371 U.S. 24	1962
Jones v. United States (1962)	371 U.S. 25	1962
Vitoratos v. Yacobucci	371 U.S. 25	1962
Boston & Maine R.R. Co. v. United States	371 U.S. 26	1962
Garvin v. Cochran	371 U.S. 27	1962
Walton v. Arkansas	371 U.S. 28	1962
Ioannou v. New York	371 U.S. 30	1962
Kavanagh v. Brown	371 U.S. 35	1962
City of Akron v. Ohio ex rel. McElroy	371 U.S. 35	1962
Geer v. Bowers	371 U.S. 36	1962
Consolidated Rock Prods. Co. v. City of Los Angeles	371 U.S. 36	1962
Alabama v. United States	371 U.S. 37	1962
United States v. Loew's Inc.	371 U.S. 38	1962
Southern Constr. Co. v. Pickard	371 U.S. 57	1962
Wetzel v. Ohio	371 U.S. 62	1962
Citizens Util. Co. v. Superior Ct.	371 U.S. 67	1962
Brookshire v. Missouri	371 U.S. 67	1962
Brookshire v. Contestible	371 U.S. 68	1962
Grisanti v. City of Cleveland	371 U.S. 68	1962
Chicago & E. Ill. R.R. Co. v. United States	371 U.S. 69	1962
Gluckstern v. New York	371 U.S. 69	1962
United States v. Bliss & Laughlin, Inc.	371 U.S. 70	1962
Presser v. United States	371 U.S. 71	1962
Ex parte George	371 U.S. 72	1962
Lanza v. Wagner	371 U.S. 74	1962
United States v. Sampson	371 U.S. 75	1962
Hewitt-Robins Inc. v. E. Freight-Ways, Inc.	371 U.S. 84	1962
Meat Drivers v. United States	371 U.S. 94	1962
Vitoratos v. Walsh	371 U.S. 114	1962
La Rose v. Tahash	371 U.S. 114	1962
Gilbertville Trucking Co. v. United States	371 U.S. 115	1962
Pearlman v. Reliance Ins. Co.	371 U.S. 132	1962
FPC v. Tennessee Gas Transmission Co.	371 U.S. 145	1962
Burlington Truck Lines, Inc. v. United States	371 U.S. 156	1962
Foman v. Davis	371 U.S. 178	1962
Pensick & Gordon, Inc. v. Cal. Motor Express	371 U.S. 184	1962
Lee v. Peek	371 U.S. 184	1962
Buckles v. Peoples Gas Light & Coke Co.	371 U.S. 185	1962
Stonybrook, Inc. v. Connecticut	371 U.S. 185	1962
Ahoyian v. Massachusetts Tpk. Auth.	371 U.S. 186	1962
Napier v. United States	371 U.S. 186	1962
Ford v. Ford	371 U.S. 187	1962
Smith v. Evening News Ass'n	371 U.S. 195	1962
Stock v. Terrence	371 U.S. 206	1962
Spahos v. City of Savannah Beach	371 U.S. 206	1962
Lever Bros. Co. v. United States	371 U.S. 207	1962
Schroeder v. City of New York	371 U.S. 208	1962
Harris Truck Lines, Inc. v. Cherry Meat Packers, Inc.	371 U.S. 215	1962
Arlan's Dep't Store v. Kentucky	371 U.S. 218	1962
John J. Casale, Inc. v. United States	371 U.S. 222	1962
Clark v. Louisiana	371 U.S. 222	1962
National Motor Freight Traffic Ass'n, Inc. v. United States	371 U.S. 223	1962
NLRB v. Reliance Fuel Oil Corp.	371 U.S. 224	1963
United States v. Buffalo Sav. Bank	371 U.S. 228	1963
Southern Cal. Edison Co. v. Public Util. Comm'n	371 U.S. 231	1963
Thomas v. California	371 U.S. 231	1963
Jamieson v. Chicago Title & Tr. Co.	371 U.S. 232	1963
Voltaggio v. Caputo	371 U.S. 232	1963
Blaustein v. Aiello	371 U.S. 233	1963
Vickers v. Gloucester Twp.	371 U.S. 233	1963
Lamb v. California	371 U.S. 234	1963
Williamson v. Hopewell Redevelopment & Housing Auth.	371 U.S. 234	1963
Easter v. Department of Assessments	371 U.S. 235	1963
Johnson v. Mississippi	371 U.S. 235	1963
Jones v. Cunningham	371 U.S. 236	1963
Paul v. United States	371 U.S. 245	1963
United States v. Georgia Pub. Serv. Comm'n	371 U.S. 285	1963
Pan Am. World Airways, Inc. v. United States	371 U.S. 296	1963
Best v. Humboldt Placer Min. Co.	371 U.S. 334	1963
Shotwell Mfg. Co. v. United States	371 U.S. 341	1963
Cleary v. Bolger	371 U.S. 392	1963
NAACP v. Button	371 U.S. 415	1963
Wong Sun v. United States	371 U.S. 471	1963
FTC v. Sun Oil Co.	371 U.S. 505	1963
Williams v. Zuckert	371 U.S. 531	1963
Riddell v. Monolith Portland Cement Co.	371 U.S. 537	1963
Shenandoah Valley Broad., Inc. v. ASCAP	371 U.S. 540	1963
Ditson v. California	371 U.S. 541	1963
Construction Laborers v. Curry	371 U.S. 542	1963
Mercantile Nat'l Bank v. Langdeau	371 U.S. 555	1963
Stuart v. Wilson	371 U.S. 576	1963
Bardy v. United States	371 U.S. 576	1963
Missouri ex rel. Johnson v. Clay	371 U.S. 577	1963
Bendix Corp. v. Radio Position Finding Corp.	371 U.S. 577	1963
