= Down on Parchman Farm =

1999 book by Willian Banks Taylor

Down on Parchman Farm: The Great Prison in the Mississippi Delta
- Author: William Banks Taylor
- Language: English
- Genre: Non-fiction
- Publisher: Ohio State University Press
- Publication date: 1999
- Publication place: United States

Down on Parchman Farm: The Great Prison in the Mississippi Delta is a 1999 non-fiction book by William Banks Taylor, published by Ohio State University Press. Peggy Whitman Prenshaw wrote the foreword. It is about the Mississippi State Penitentiary in Sunflower County, Mississippi.

== Background ==
Ted Ownby, of the University of Mississippi, described the author as "by a historically minded specialist in criminal justice".

The book mainly relies on testimonies of Mississippi politicians and prison officials. Other sources are interviews, columns published in newspapers, and yearly reports made by the Mississippi Legislature.

He had previously written about the prison in Brokered Justice, which was published in 1993. This book has expanded versions of content from that book.

== Content ==
The author argues that, in the words of Ownby, there were "many successes" in the prison operation at the time of the book's publication.

Frances O. Sandiford, an employee at the library of the Green Haven Correctional Facility, stated that the book uses "a more factual approach" compared to previous literature about the prison.

Ownby stated that some of the phrasing "seems designed to flout conventional opinion." Ownby stated that the author has a "defensiveness" against the idea that Parchman was an example of an especially cruel prison and that those aspects were "uncritically exaggerated", and furthermore, Parchman had many "misunderstood successes" that "largely" characterize the prison.

According to Sandiford, the author expressed "reservations" about the prison's modernization in the late 20th century.

== Reception ==
Ownby described the book as "fascinating if often infuriating". Ownby agreed that the prison was mischaracterized as especially harsh, but argued that it would be "extremely difficult to accept" the idea that Parchman was "largely [...] misunderstood successes". Ownby stated that the book does a better job in explaining the management's rules compared to "Worse than Slavery".

Sandiford argued that, to people operating libraries, the book is "a good choice" if the library has the money to buy it, though it is "Not an essential purchase".
