= Trusty system (prison) =

Penal security system

The "trusty system" (sometimes incorrectly called "trustee system") was a penitentiary system of discipline and security enforced in parts of the United States until the 1980s, in which designated inmates were given various privileges, abilities, and responsibilities not available to all inmates.

It was made compulsory under Mississippi state law but was used in other states as well, such as Arkansas, Alabama, Louisiana, New York and Texas. The method of controlling and working inmates at Mississippi State Penitentiary at Parchman was designed in 1901 to replace convict leasing. The case Gates v. Collier (1974) ended the flagrant abuse of inmates under the trusty system and other prison abuses that had continued essentially unchanged since the building of the Mississippi State Penitentiary. Other states using the trusty system were also forced to give it up under the ruling.

== History ==
Prisons had trusties as far back as the 1800s.

=== Parchman Farm ===
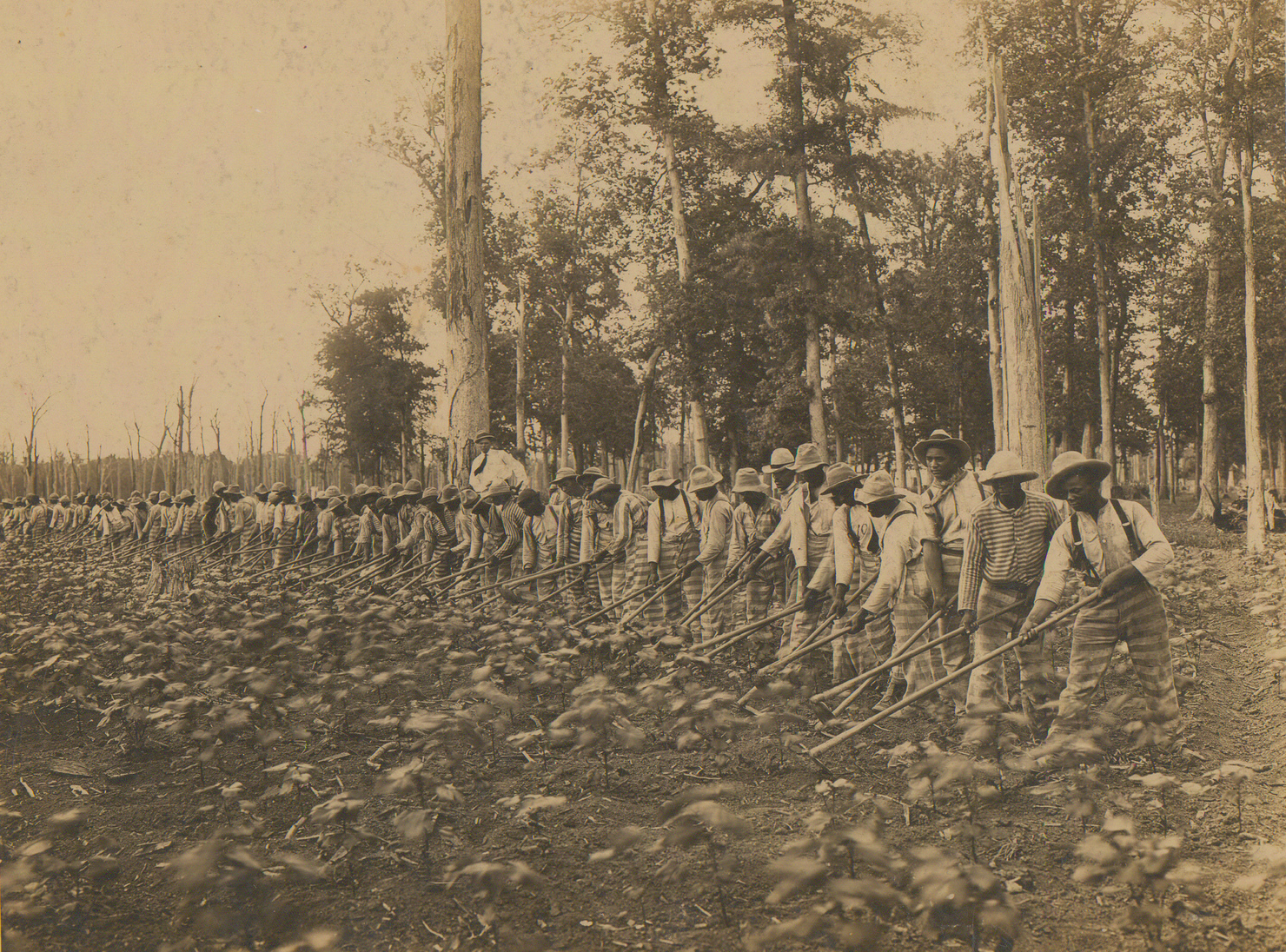
Prison labor at the Parchman Farm under the trusty system

The prison had approximately 16,000 acres (65 km^{2}) of farmland and grew such cash crops as cotton as well as engaged in livestock production. Although the population of the prison was around 1,900 inmates (two thirds of whom were black and in racially-segregated units), the law allowed only a maximum of 150 staff members to be hired to minimize operating costs. Thus, the farm labor was done by inmates.

The bulk of guarding and disciplining of the inmates was performed by inmate trusties. They also performed most of the administrative work, supervised by a few employees. Therefore, the inmate trusties essentially controlled inmate care and custody, basically running the prison system.

Highest in the prison inmate hierarchy were the inmates armed with rifles, called the "trusty shooters". Their job was to act as prison guards and control other inmates on a day-to-day basis in the residential camps or out on the field work crews. Next came the unarmed trusties who performed janitorial, clerical, and other menial tasks for the prison's staff. Simple tasks, such as distributing medication, were carried out by other categories of inmates such as "hallboys". Inmate trusties enforced discipline within the prison inmate living quarters (16 different residential camps) and in the work camps and prison farms. In addition to punishment administered on site, inmate trusties could recommend further punishment in the special punishment area for disobedient or disruptive inmates.

According to attorney Roy Haber, who handled the series of litigation cases brought by the American Civil Liberties Union against the trusty system, inmates were whipped with leather straps for failing to pick their daily quota of cotton. The farm's camps of black inmates were supervised by one white sergeant, and under him the black inmate "trusty shooters", who were serving sentences for murder, carried rifles and enforced discipline.

== Abolition ==
Gates v. Collier (Gates v. Collier Prison Reform Case, 1970–1971) ended the flagrant abuse of inmates under the trusty system and other prison abuses that had continued essentially unchanged since the building of the prison in 1903. On October 20, 1972, Federal Judge William Keady ordered the end of racial segregation in prison residential quarters. He also required replacement of trusty shooters with civilian prison guards.

Any system in which inmates were allowed to be in a position of authority and control other inmates or to use physical abuse or intimidation of other inmates was abolished. It also found some types of corporal punishment were a violation of an inmate's Eighth Amendment rights, including "handcuffing inmates to the fence and to cells for, long periods of time,... and forcing inmates to stand, sit or lie on crates, stumps, or otherwise maintain awkward positions for prolonged periods."

Its structure and abuses were detailed in Hope v. Pelzer in which a former inmate sued the prison superintendent for personal injury suffered under the trusty system.

Other states using the trusty system, such as Arkansas, Alabama, Louisiana, and Texas were also forced to abolish it under the Gates v. Collier rulings. However, some states, such as Texas, still continued their use of trusty systems (known as "building tenders") until the 1980s, when Federal Judge William Wayne Justice, in Ruiz v. Estelle, 503 F. Supp. 1265 (S.D. Tex. 1980), compelled the replacement of the trusty system with the strictly-regulated Support Service Inmate (SSI) system.

== See also ==
- "Parchman Farm" (song)
- Louisiana State Penitentiary
- Kapo

== Bibliography ==
- Oshinsky, David M. (1996). Worse Than Slavery: Parchman Farm and the Ordeal of Jim Crow Justice. New York: The Free Press ISBN 0-684-83095-7.
- Taylor, William Banks (1999). Down on Parchman Farm. Ohio State University Press. ISBN 978-0-8142-5023-5.
