= Pervear v. Massachusetts =

- Supreme Court of the United States

Argued April 17, 1867 Decided April 29, 1867
- Full case name: Pervear v. the Commonwealth of Massachusetts
- Citations: 72 U.S. 475 (more) 5 Wall. 475; 18 L. Ed. 608; 1866 U.S. LEXIS 953

Court membership
- Chief Justice Salmon P. Chase Associate Justices James M. Wayne · Samuel Nelson; Robert C. Grier · Nathan Clifford; Noah H. Swayne · Samuel F. Miller; David Davis · Stephen J. Field

Case opinion
- Majority: Chase, joined by unanimous
- Overruled by
- Jones v. Cunningham, 371 U.S. 236 (1963)

Pervear v. Massachusetts, 72 U.S. (5 Wall.) 475 (1866), was a case brought before the United States Supreme Court in 1866 over the issue of prisoners' rights. The court ruled that prisoners have no constitutional rights, not even Eighth Amendment rights. This was the first case stating the "hands off" policy that allowed states to run their prisons without federal interference. The application of the Bill of Rights to state action did not come until later and then only in part.

At that time in history, the Bill of Rights was seen as a bar to federal interference with state actions, and therefore a means of ensuring federal restraint.

== Background ==
A Massachusetts business owner was convicted and sentenced to the payment of a large fine and to three months of hard labor for failing to have a state license for his liquor store. He tried to invoke the "cruel and unusual punishment" clause of the Eighth Amendment.

== Decision ==
The Supreme Court ruled that the Constitution did not apply to state cases but only to federal issues. Pervear did not take the case further.

This "hands off" policy was not successfully challenged until 1963 when Jones v. Cunningham had the Supreme Court rule that inmates in state institutions could file a writ of habeas corpus challenging the conditions of their imprisonment as well as its legality.
