= Michael J. Ybarra =

American journalist, author and adventurer (1966-2012)

Michael J. Ybarra

Michael Jay Ybarra (September 28, 1966 – June 30 or July 1, 2012) was an American journalist, author and adventurer whose non-fiction work appeared in various national publications. In 2004, his book about McCarthyism, Washington Gone Crazy: Senator Pat McCarran and the Great American Communist Hunt, won the D.B. Hardeman Prize. As the extreme sports correspondent for The Wall Street Journal, Ybarra wrote articles about outdoor adventure, providing the genre with a wider audience than it typically receives.

== Life and career ==
Born and raised in Los Angeles, Ybarra graduated from the University of California, Los Angeles, in 1990 with a B.A. in political science. It was during his undergraduate years at UCLA that he started writing professionally for the Los Angeles Times, followed by the Chicago Tribune. During his brief stint at the Chicago Tribune, he interviewed future President Barack Obama. After graduating from UCLA, Ybarra moved to Washington, D.C., where he wrote for The Washington Post. He left to return to school and graduated from the University of California, Berkeley, in 1992 with an M.A. in political science.

Ybarra had a 25-year career as a journalist and author. An article he wrote for The Washington Post, "Activists Attest to Romania's Idea of Democracy", was entered into the Congressional Record at the request of Senator Ted Kennedy. His story about Hurricane Katrina for CIO Decisions magazine, "The Long Road Back", won a National Azbee Gold Award from the American Society of Business Publication Editors and a Bronze Tabbie Award for feature article. Ybarra reported on a wide variety of topics and people, including President Obama, Pulitzer Prize-winning author Michael Chabon, Patagonia founder and climber Yvon Chouinard, novelist Norman Mailer, historian Arthur Schlesinger, Jr., veteran climber Fred Beckey and television personality Bill Maher.

External videos
- Presentation by Ybarra on Washington Gone Crazy, November 13, 2004, C-SPAN

In the early 1990s, Ybarra began working for The Wall Street Journal as a staff reporter in its San Francisco bureau. It was during this period that he started researching and writing Washington Gone Crazy. The book was published by Steerforth in 2004 to critical acclaim. Author, professor and CBS News commentator Douglas Brinkley wrote: "Esteemed scholar Michael J. Ybarra's Washington Gone Crazy — based on extensive new archival research — offers a fair-minded, and ultimately devastating, portrait of Nevada's notorious Cold Warrior. A truly landmark study." It was a finalist for the Los Angeles Times Book Prize and was shortlisted for the Ambassador Book Award in American Studies, and The New York Times Book Review listed it among the 100 Notable Books of the Year. Washington Gone Crazy also won the D.B. Hardeman Prize for the best book on Congress from the Lyndon B. Johnson Foundation. Award committee member H. W. Brands, the Dickson, Allen, Anderson Centennial Professor of History at the University of Texas at Austin, said Ybarra's work was "that rare book which has something really new to say on an old subject". A digital version, featuring an introduction by Sam Tanenhaus, a former editor of The New York Times Book Review, was released in 2015.

While on a trip to Peru in 2004, Ybarra took his first climbing lessons. He subsequently became an avid climber and adventurer. Ybarra traveled widely, climbing, hiking and kayaking in such places as Nepal, Peru, Chile, Argentina, Switzerland, Italy, Thailand, Mexico, Canada, Alaska, Montana, Utah and the Sierra Nevada. From 2007 until his death in 2012, he chronicled his adventures for The Wall Street Journal as its extreme sports correspondent, publishing more than 30 pieces.

== Death and legacy ==
Ybarra died on June 30, 2012, in a climbing accident on the Sawtooth Ridge in Yosemite National Park. Ybarra’s sister, Suzanne, said the family had reported him missing on Sunday after he did not return from what was supposed to be a two-day solo climb. Upon Ybarra's death, The Wall Street Journal released the following statement: "Michael Ybarra was an extraordinary journalist. In the best traditions of his profession he enlightened and engaged readers on a wide array of topics in clear, vivid prose. His passion for the outdoors was evident not only in his writing for the Leisure & Arts and Book sections — reviews and essays written with such verve you felt you were right beside him on a mountain face or in a kayak — but in the way he lived. We mourn his passing, and send our thoughts and prayers to his family."

As a writer, he left behind a large body of published work spanning more than two decades. A portion of Ybarra's personal collection of climbing books is housed at the California Institute of Technology in the Sherman Fairchild Library as "The Michael J. Ybarra Memorial Collection." Bret Israel, Sunday Calendar editor of the Los Angeles Times, established a scholarship at UCLA in Ybarra's memory for humanities students studying abroad. Ybarra's Pat McCarran memorabilia is available to the public at the Nevada Historical Society in Reno. His papers for Washington Gone Crazy are at the Hoover Institution at Stanford.

== Selected bibliography ==
Books

- Washington Gone Crazy: Senator Pat McCarran and The Great American Communist Hunt (1st ed. Hanover, N.H.: Steerforth Press, 2004), pp. 818. ISBN 1586420658.

Articles

- "El Capitan: The Movie." Alpinist Issue 40, Autumn 2012. October 2012.
- "How to Survive a Rushing River." The Wall Street Journal May 21, 2012.
- "The Nose in a Day." The Wall Street Journal February 2, 2012.
- "The Climbing Life." Alpinist Issue 36, Autumn 2011. October 2011: 27–30
- "Nature as artist's muse." Los Angeles Times April 21, 2008.
- "Taking on the law." Los Angeles Times October 5, 2003.
- "The New India Of High-Tech Companies And Investors Is Trying To Overcome Its Old World Image." Upside September 2001: 42–51
- "It's Finally Time: The Age of Schlesinger." Los Angeles Times November 16, 2000.
- "Blacklist Whitewash." The New Republic January 5, 1998.
- "San Francisco Journal; A Time to Rejoice In Mantle of Power". The New York Times. January 9, 1996.
