= Majority opinion =

Judicial opinion agreed to by more than half of the court's justices

In law, a majority opinion is a judicial opinion agreed to by more than half of the members of a court. A majority opinion sets forth the decision of the court and an explanation of the rationale behind the court's decision.

Not all cases have a majority opinion. Some opinions are unanimous. At other times, the justices voting for a majority decision (e.g., to affirm or reverse the lower court's decision) may have drastically different reasons for their votes, and cannot agree on the same set of reasons. In that situation, several concurring opinions may be written, none of which is the view of a majority of the members of the court. In that instance, the concurring opinion joined by the greatest number of judges is referred to as the plurality opinion.

Normally, appellate courts (or panels) are staffed with an odd number of judges to avoid a tie. Sometimes, and in some jurisdictions, when judicial positions are vacant or a judge has recused themselves from a case, the court may be stuck with a tie, in which case the lower court's decision will be affirmed without comment by an equally divided court. Since 1826, this has been the standard policy of the Supreme Court of the United States.

A majority opinion in countries which use the common law system becomes part of the body of case law. However, when the court is stuck with a tie and is unable to issue a majority opinion, an affirmance by an equally divided court is res judicata and binding upon the parties, but it does not create legal precedent binding in future cases involving unrelated parties.

== Variations in practice by jurisdiction ==
There is a key stylistic difference between the United States on the one hand, and the United Kingdom and other common law jurisdictions on the other. In the United States, the disposition of an appeal in a majority opinion is usually drafted in the present tense, so that the disposition is itself a performative utterance. That is, a U.S. court will say that "we affirm (or reverse)" the lower court's decision, or, "the decision of the [lower court] is hereby affirmed (or reversed)." By saying so, the court does so.

In the United Kingdom and many other common law countries, the disposition in a majority opinion is phrased in the future tense as a recommendation. For example, the Justices of the Supreme Court of the United Kingdom end a majority opinion by stating that "I would dismiss the appeal" or "I would allow the appeal", while the Justices of the High Court of Australia end a majority opinion by stating that "the appeal should be dismissed" or "the appeal should be allowed".

The main reason for phrasing dispositions as recommendations is that historically, the highest court in the United Kingdom was the Appellate Committee of the House of Lords, which adhered to the legal fiction that its opinions were merely speeches delivered in debate in the House of Lords, upon motion by a member of the Appellate Committee to consider its "report" on a particular legal matter. Although the actual reading of such speeches was abandoned in 1963, the motion to consider the Committee's report was always immediately followed by seriatim motions to "agree to" the Committee's report, to dispose of the matter as recommended, and to award costs as recommended. There was no final decision binding upon the parties until the House of Lords had formally exercised parliamentary sovereignty by voting on such pro forma motions to accept the Committee's recommendations. In contrast, U.S. judges are not mere appendages of royal authority; as expressly envisioned by Alexander Hamilton in Federalist No. 78, they act directly as agents of the true sovereign, the people.

American dissenting and concurring opinions are sometimes partially drafted in the future tense, since they are speaking in terms of hypothetical situations that will not occur, as opposed to what the majority is doing in its opinion. However, even dissenting opinions may end in a present tense performative utterance, which is usually some variation on the phrase "I respectfully dissent."

In some courts, such as the U.S. Supreme Court, the majority opinion may be broken down into numbered or lettered sections. This allows judges who write an opinion "concurring in part" or "dissenting in part" to easily identify which parts they join with the majority, and which sections they do not.
