= Charles Ray Crawford =

Executed American convicted murderer and rapist (1966–2025)

- 2017 mugshot of Crawford
- Born: February 10, 1966; Mississippi, U.S.
- Died: October 15, 2025 (aged 59); Mississippi State Penitentiary, Mississippi, U.S.
- Status: Executed by lethal injection
- Convictions: Capital murder Rape (x2); Sexual battery Burglary; Aggravated assault
- Penalty: Death (April 23, 1994)

Details
- Victims: 1 dead, 2 survived
- Date: April 13, 1991 (rape); January 29, 1993 (murder)
- Locations: Walnut, Mississippi (1991); Tippah County, Mississippi (1993)
- Imprisoned at: Mississippi State Penitentiary

Charles Ray Crawford (February 10, 1966 – October 15, 2025) was an American convicted serial rapist and murderer. On January 29, 1993, four days before he was to stand trial for an unrelated rape and assault case, Crawford kidnapped a 20-year-old community college student named Kristy Ray from her home in Tippah County, Mississippi, before raping and murdering the victim. Crawford was later arrested and found guilty of the rape-murder of Ray, and sentenced to death in 1994, as well as 46 years' imprisonment for the unrelated rape case. Crawford's appeals were all dismissed and his death sentence was carried out on October 15, 2025.

== Background ==
Charles Ray Crawford was born in Mississippi on February 10, 1966. He had been married twice in his life with a son from his second marriage.

On April 13, 1991, Crawford encountered his first wife's 17-year-old sister, who was driving together with her friend in the latter's grandfather's car. Crawford drove the girls to their house, but ended up bringing them both to an abandoned house. He forced his former sister-in-law into the house at gunpoint, gagged her and tied her hands up with tape. He proceeded to rape the 17-year-old, and he also used a hammer to assault the other girl. As a result of this crime, He was charged with rape, assault and kidnapping, and therefore set to stand trial for these charges in February 1993.

== Murder of Kristy Ray ==
On January 29, 1993, four days before Crawford was scheduled to stand trial for rape and assault, Charles Crawford, then 26 years old and out on bail, committed the kidnapping, rape and murder of a student in Tippah County, Mississippi.

On that afternoon, 20-year-old Kristy Denice Ray (November 26, 1972 – January 29, 1993), a German-born community college student, visited the Sunburst Bank in Mississippi, where her mother worked. Ray was also a part-time employee at the same bank while pursuing her studies at Northeast Mississippi Community College. Around 5:15 p.m., Ray and her mother left work together, planning to reunite later that evening at their home in Chalybeate.

However, after reaching home, Ray was kidnapped from her home by Crawford, who encountered her while burglarizing her house. Crawford would later forcibly bring Ray to an abandoned barn, where he raped her and later stabbed her to death. Simultaneously, Ray's family were alerted of her disappearance, after Ray's mother could not find her and also found their family home ransacked. She also discovered a ransom note left behind by Crawford in her house. The family subsequently filed a police report.

The same day when Ray was abducted and killed, Crawford's family discovered a ransom note in their attic that was similar to the one found by Ray's mother. Concerned that Crawford, who was scheduled to go on trial in the next four days for rape and assault, might be planning a kidnapping, his mother, wife, and grandfather notified Crawford's lawyer William Fortier of the finding, and this was also reported to the police. After some investigations, the police were able to link Crawford to the disappearance of Ray, and the following day, Crawford was arrested near the house of his former father-in-law. At the time of his arrest, he was armed with a double-barrel shotgun and a switchblade.

== Trial ==
After his arrest, Crawford was charged with the rape and murder of Kristy Ray. He initially denied killing Ray, stating that he had blackouts and only remembered parts of the crime, but not the murder. Later he admitted that "he must have killed her" and led the police to where he left Ray's corpse behind.

After standing trial for Ray's murder in 1994, Crawford used an insanity defense. A prison psychiatrist who had treated him testified that he experienced depression and episodes of memory loss. The psychiatrist also discussed Crawford’s history of psychiatric hospitalization, his prior use of medication, and a 1989 diagnosis of bipolar disorder.

In contrast, a clinical psychologist called as a rebuttal witness testified that there was no indication Crawford had bipolar disorder. The psychologist also noted that Crawford appeared to have acted with premeditation and understood the difference between right and wrong. A second rebuttal witness, a forensic psychiatrist, stated that Crawford had been incorrectly diagnosed with psychogenic amnesia.

On April 22, 1994, Crawford was found guilty of capital murder, sexual battery, burglary and rape on all counts by a Lafayette County jury.

On April 23, 1994, Crawford was sentenced to death upon the jury's unanimous recommendation for capital punishment. He was also given a life sentence without parole for rape, plus 15 years and 30 years for burglary and sexual battery respectively.

Additionally, Crawford was found guilty of rape in the other case he committed prior to Ray's killing. He was sentenced to 46 years in prison for the offence.

== Appeals ==
=== Death sentence appeal ===
On March 12, 1998, the Mississippi Supreme Court dismissed Crawford's direct appeal against the death sentence.

On June 27, 2013, the 5th U.S. Circuit Court of Appeals upheld the death sentence and murder conviction of Crawford.

Subsequently, in January 2014, Crawford appealed to the U.S. Supreme Court. On February 24, 2014, the U.S. Supreme Court rejected Crawford's final appeal against his death sentence.

=== Rape conviction appeal ===
In February 2014, the same month when the Mississippi Attorney General requested an execution date for Crawford, he sought leave to make further appeals, pertaining to his conviction of raping a teenage girl in another incident.

On April 16, 2014, the Mississippi Supreme Court first heard the appeal of Crawford against his rape conviction. Crawford's lawyers argued that he was represented by ineffective trial counsel at the time of the rape trial.The prosecution were also granted additional time to make submissions in response to Crawford's motion.

On October 13, 2014, the Mississippi state prosecutors requested the Mississippi Supreme Court to deny the appeal of Crawford against his rape conviction, pointing out that he only filed it 20 years after his trial and they argued that Crawford received a fair trial for his rape charge. Ultimately, on December 8, 2014, the Mississippi Supreme Court denied the prosecution's request to strike out Crawford's appeal in his rape case and allowed it to proceed. The Mississippi Supreme Court first heard arguments in March 2015.

On August 27, 2015, Crawford's appeal against his rape conviction was dismissed by the Mississippi Supreme Court.

In May 2023, the 5th U.S. Circuit Court of Appeals dismissed Crawford's appeal against his rape conviction. Another appeal to the 5th U.S. Circuit Court of Appeals was also turned down in November 2024.

On February 26, 2025, Crawford's final appeal against his rape conviction was brought forward to the U.S. Supreme Court.

On June 2, 2025, the U.S. Supreme Court denied Crawford's final appeal against his rape conviction.

== Execution ==
Originally, in February 2014, the Mississippi Attorney General petitioned to the Mississippi Supreme Court to schedule the execution dates of Crawford and another prisoner. However, on March 31, 2014, the Mississippi Supreme Court ruled against the Attorney General's motion for an execution date ruling that Crawford had the right to appeal the rape conviction before an execution date is set because the prosecutors used the rape conviction a statutory aggravating factor to justify a death sentence for Crawford.

On November 26, 2024, Mississippi Attorney General Lynn Fitch filed a motion to the Mississippi Supreme Court, seeking an execution date for Crawford, who had exhausted all his avenues of appeal against the death sentence. However, Crawford's lawyers opposed the scheduling of Crawford's execution, stating that he had not exhausted his appeals against his other conviction of rape, which he committed in another case, and a final appeal to the U.S. Supreme Court was planned for this particular case.

On June 3, 2025, a day after the U.S. Supreme Court denied Crawford's final appeal against his rape conviction, Fitch filed a renewed petition for Crawford to receive a new execution date.

On September 12, 2025, the Mississippi Supreme Court signed a death warrant for Crawford, scheduling his death sentence to be carried out on October 15, 2025.

On October 2, 2025, Crawford's lawyers filed a final appeal to the U.S. Supreme Court to stay his execution. In response, the state prosecution argued that Crawford's guilt was not in doubt and that his execution should proceed as scheduled. Ultimately, the U.S. Supreme Court dismissed the final appeal of Crawford.

On October 7, 2025, death penalty opponents banded together to protest against Crawford's scheduled execution. In the end, Mississippi Governor Tate Reeves denied clemency for Crawford on October 13, 2025.

On October 15, 2025, Crawford was put to death by lethal injection in the Mississippi State Penitentiary at 6:15 pm. Prior to his execution, Crawford ate a last meal of a double cheeseburger, french fries, peach cobbler and chocolate ice cream.

Crawford was one of seven inmates scheduled to be executed in October 2025 across the United States. Crawford was also one of four inmates slated to be executed within the same week.

== In popular media ==
In 2019, the case of Kristy Ray's murder was re-enacted in an episode of true crime documentary Your Worst Nightmare.

== See also ==
- Capital punishment in Mississippi
- List of most recent executions by jurisdiction
- List of people executed in Mississippi
- List of people executed in the United States in 2025

Executions carried out in Mississippi
| Preceded by Richard Gerald Jordan June 25, 2025 | Charles Ray Crawford; October 15, 2025 | Succeeded by most recent |
Executions carried out in the United States
| Preceded by Lance Shockley – Missouri October 14, 2025 | Charles Ray Crawford – Mississippi; October 15, 2025 | Succeeded by Richard Djerf – Arizona October 17, 2025 |
