= Murder of Leesa Gray =

2001 kidnapping, rape, and murder of a teenage girl in Mississippi, U.S.

Leesa Gray
- Leesa Marie Gray, pictured before her death
- Born: Leesa Marie Gray; July 11, 1983; Dorsey, Itawamba County, Mississippi, U.S.
- Died: June 23, 2000 (aged 16); Dorsey, Itawamba County, Mississippi, U.S.
- Cause of death: Strangulation
- Resting place: Dorsey Memorial Cemetery
- Education: Itawamba Agricultural High School
- Occupation: Student
- Known for: Victim of a rape-murder case
- Parents: John Gray (father); Wanda Farris (mother)
- Family: Mike Farris (stepfather); James Farris (brother)

On the night of June 22, 2000, 16-year-old Leesa Marie Gray was abducted by Marine Corps recruiter Thomas Edwin Loden Jr. after she finished her shift at a restaurant in Dorsey, Mississippi. Loden held Gray captive inside his van, where he sexually assaulted her several times before he murdered her by strangling and suffocating her during the early morning hours of June 23, 2000. On that afternoon, Gray's naked body was found inside Loden's van, and Loden himself was found lying on the roadside with the words "I'm sorry" carved into his chest and self-inflicted cut wounds on his wrists.

In the following year of 2001, Loden, who waived his right to a jury trial, pleaded guilty to all six criminal charges, mainly capital murder, rape, and sexual battery, and he was sentenced to death for murdering Gray. Loden was on death row for 21 years before he was executed via lethal injection on December 14, 2022.

== Abduction and murder ==
On the night of June 22, 2000, in Dorsey, northeastern Mississippi, a 16-year-old schoolgirl was kidnapped outside her uncle's restaurant, and later raped and murdered by her abductor.

According to official sources, the victim, 16-year-old Leesa Marie Gray, a student at Itawamba Agricultural High School, was working as a part-time waitress at her uncle's restaurant for the summer before the senior year of her high school. On that night itself, Gray completed her work shift and started heading home. However, along the way, Gray's car got a flat tire. It was at this point when a 35-year-old Marine named Thomas Edwin Loden Jr. (alias Eddie Loden) approached her at around 10.45 pm and began talking to her, assuring her that he was a Marine and he could help her settle the flat tire problem.

Allegedly, when Loden asked if Gray wanted to join the Marine Corps, Gray purportedly said she would never want to be a Marine. This enraged Loden, so he forced the teenager into the van. While holding Gray captive inside the van, Loden raped the girl and continually sexually abused her for over four hours. Reportedly, Loden even videotaped what was happening during Gray's captivity. In the early hours of June 23, 2000, around four hours after he had first abducted Gray, Loden strangled the 16-year-old victim to death.

Meanwhile, Gray's family members were alarmed when she did not return home after work. They began searching for her, eventually finding her car abandoned where she was abducted, with her purse was still inside the vehicle. Later that afternoon, Loden was sighted lying on the roadside with the words "I'm sorry" carved into his chest and with lacerations on his wrists, which he self-inflicted in a suicide attempt. Subsequently, Gray's naked body was discovered pushed under a folded-down seat of Loden's van, with her hands and feet bound. Itawamba County Coroner Shirley Davis conducted a post-mortem examination of Gray's body and determined the cause of death to be asphyxiation by manual strangulation.

Gray's rape and murder shocked the Dorsey community. It was further revealed that the relatives of Loden and Gray knew each other. Loden's aunt had sewn clothes for Gray's family in the past. One of Gray's relatives expressed that he felt sorry for Loden's family for the case's impact on their lives. Loden's wife, who lived in Vicksburg with their daughter, described Loden as a "good father and husband" and struggled to understand why her husband committed such a heinous crime. Over 1,000 people, including Gray's family and friends attended her funeral, which took place in the gymnasium of Itawamba Agricultural High School, where Gray had been a student.

== Thomas Edwin Loden Jr. ==
=== Background ===
Thomas Edwin Loden Jr.
- Born: August 16, 1964; Mississippi, U.S.
- Died: December 14, 2022 (aged 58); Mississippi State Penitentiary, Mississippi, U.S.
- Cause of death: Execution by lethal injection
- Convictions: Capital murder (x1); Rape (x1); Sexual battery (x4)
- Penalty: 150 years' imprisonment (Rape and sexual battery); Death (murder)

Details
- Victims: Leesa Marie Gray, 16
- Date: June 22–23, 2000
- Location: Itawamba County, Mississippi
- Imprisoned at: Mississippi State Penitentiary

Born on August 16, 1964, Thomas Edwin Loden Jr. was raised in Mississippi. Loden had a troubled childhood marred by physical and sexual abuse. Loden's mother was 17 when she married his father, and the marriage ended in divorce when he was a toddler. Loden witnessed his father physically and sexually abuse his mother. He bounced between living with his parents, and suffered abuse from his stepparents. Loden was sexually assaulted by a church staff member while attending Bible school.

Loden developed suicidal tendencies during his childhood and attempted to kill himself several times. He also struggled with substance abuse. Loden would go on to live with his grandparents at their farm in Itawamba County, where his circumstances improved. Despite his upbringing, Loden performed well in school. In 1982, Loden graduated from Itawamba Agricultural High School, the same school Leesa Marie Gray would later attend.

After completing high school, Loden joined the United States Marine Corps, where he would serve as a Marine for 18 years. At the time of Gray's murder, he had attained the rank of gunnery sergeant. Loden had an exemplary record in the military and received multiple awards during his career. Loden was a Gulf War veteran and during his deployment, witnessed the death of a close friend and others in his unit. These traumatic incidents led to him developing alcohol and substance abuse issues. Loden began to suffer with social anxiety and gradually became estranged from his loved ones. A psychologist cooperating with Loden's defense counsel diagnosed Loden with post-traumatic stress disorder due to childhood trauma and his experiences during the Gulf War.

Loden was married three times, with his first two marriages failing due to infidelity. He met his third wife in Virginia in 1995. During this time, Loden became a member of the Marine Corps’ Anti-Terrorism Security Team. The couple married in Virginia and had a daughter. Loden moved back to Mississippi with his third wife and daughter, and settled in Vicksburg where he worked as a recruiter for the Marines. By the time of Gray's murder, he was estranged from his wife.

=== Charges and trial ===
On June 24, 2000, Loden was charged with one count of capital murder, one count of rape and four counts of sexual battery. For the charge of capital murder under Mississippi state law, Loden faced a death sentence or life in prison with or without the possibility of parole. During his incarceration, Arkansas state authorities suspected that Loden was responsible for the murder of another teenage girl. Mississippi state authorities were contacted in regards to the case, but Loden was never charged.

In June 2001, due to the publicity surrounding the murder in Itawamba County, Loden's case was transferred and he stood trial at the Rankin County Courthouse.

On September 21, 2001, Loden waived his right to a jury trial and pleaded guilty to all six charges. He was convicted of the rape and murder of Leesa Marie Gray.

Loden chose to forgo jury sentencing and opted to be sentenced by the trial judge. He pleaded no contest to the state's evidence and did not present a mitigation plea. Prior to his sentencing, Loden personally addressed the court and Gray's family, saying: "I hope you may have some sense of justice when you leave here today."

Circuit Judge Thomas Gardner found that in accordance with Mississippi law, the four aggravating factors that warranted the death penalty were all satisfied in the case of Loden, and the mitigating factors did not outweigh the aggravating factors. On the balance of the probabilities, Loden was sentenced to death for the murder of Leesa Marie Gray. For the remaining five charges of rape and sexual battery, Justice Gardner also imposed five consecutive sentences of 30 years' imprisonment, for an additional 150 years imprisonment.

== Loden's appeals ==
In July 2003, Thomas Loden Jr. submitted an appeal to vacate his plea of guilt with respect to the charge of murder, stating that he was represented by ineffective legal counsel and he was wrongly advised in pleading guilty and did not have adequate opportunity to make a mitigation plea and seek a life sentence rather than death. However, a circuit court in Mississippi dismissed the appeal, and in 2007, the Mississippi Supreme Court rejected Loden's appeal against the circuit court's ruling, affirming that Loden voluntarily and willingly submitted his plea of guilt and it was not due to ineffective legal counsel.

In 2008, the U.S. Supreme Court turned down a follow-up appeal from Loden.

In 2010, Loden's second petition for post-conviction relief was dismissed by the Mississippi Supreme Court.

In 2013, Loden's plea for an evidentiary hearing before a federal judge was rejected by U.S. District Judge Neal Brooks Biggers Jr. of the United States District Court for the Northern District of Mississippi. Loden appealed against this decision in 2014.

In March 2015, the 5th U.S. Circuit Court of Appeals rejected Loden's petition for a re-trial. In November 2015, the U.S. Supreme Court also refused to hear another appeal from Loden.

In February 2016, Loden and two other death row inmates – Ricky Chase and Richard Jordan – appealed to the 5th U.S. Circuit Court of Appeals and challenged the state's lethal injection protocols, and it was dismissed. A motion for a re-hearing in this case was also rejected June of that same year. At this point in time, Loden and Jordan had exhausted all their appeals and the state Attorney General could apply to the Mississippi Supreme Court to set execution dates for both of them.

In 2017, the Mississippi Supreme Court rejected another appeal from Loden for post-conviction relief.

In 2018, Loden appealed to the Mississippi Supreme Court and challenged the Mississippi Department of Corrections' use of midazolam in its lethal-injection protocol and claimed that administering the wrong amount of the drug would not subject the convict to a sufficient level of unconsciousness so as to not feel any pain, and it constituted as a cruel and unusual punishment to subject the convict to severe pain during the execution procedure. The Mississippi Supreme Court thereafter ruled against Loden and rejected the petition, since similar arguments raised in a precedent case was also dismissed by an Oklahoma court.

== Death warrant ==
In August 2017, Attorney General Jim Hood expressed his intention to seek an approval of Thomas Loden Jr.'s death warrant after the Mississippi prison officials confirmed that they obtained new drug supplies to facilitate the lethal injection executions. At this point in time, due to legal challenges and drug shortages, an unofficial moratorium on executions was ongoing in Mississippi since 2012 after Gary Carl Simmons Jr. was last executed for murdering a local drug dealer in 1996. The moratorium lasted for nine years before the state resumed executions in 2021; 50-year-old David Neal Cox, who was found guilty of murdering his estranged wife in 2010, was executed on November 17, 2021 after waiving his right to appeal.

On October 4, 2022, 21 years after Loden was first condemned to death row, the Mississippi Attorney General filed a motion to the Mississippi Supreme Court, seeking an approval of Loden's death warrant. While the state was seeking to schedule the execution date of Loden, Loden and four other death row inmates were involved in a federal lawsuit challenging the state’s lethal injection protocol and its use of a three-drug lethal injection to execute criminals. The lawsuit was originally rejected by the 5th U.S. Circuit Court of Appeals before it was sent back to the district courts for re-hearing, and it was still unresolved. The Attorney General's office revealed in a statement that the lawsuit was "not an impediment to setting Loden’s execution".

On October 17, 2022, Loden's lawyers opposed to the state's motion to set an execution date for Loden while he was still part of an ongoing federal lawsuit in relation to Mississippi's execution protocols and the lawsuit was yet to be resolved, and his avenues of appeal were not exhausted in view of this situation, which made it inappropriate to have Loden executed.

On November 17, 2022, by a majority decision of seven to two, the Mississippi Supreme Court approved the death warrant of Loden, whose execution date was scheduled on December 14, 2022. Chief Justice Michael Randolph, one of the seven judges who penned the majority decision, ruled that the court was satisfied that Loden has exhausted all state and federal avenues of appeal and granted the Attorney General's application.

On November 28, 2022, U.S. District Judge Henry Wingate, who heard the lawsuit of Loden and the other four, stated that he would issue a ruling in relation to the matter, especially noting that Loden's death sentence was scheduled to be carried out in two weeks. Loden's lawyers continued to seek a stay of execution since the lawsuit was still heard before the courts and his participation was still required.

On December 7, 2022, a week before Loden was due to be executed, District Judge Wingate allowed Loden's execution to move forward in spite of the lawsuit. He ruled that the U.S. Supreme Court had once upheld a three-drug lethal injection protocol in another case from Oklahoma in 2015, and that the plaintiffs did not prove their case in opposing the state's execution protocols. Loden's death sentence was confirmed to be carried out by lethal injection, the primary execution method used in Mississippi, where executions by firing squad, lethal gas or electrocution are also permitted as alternative execution methods.

On December 11, 2022, three days before Loden's impending execution, Leesa Marie Gray's mother Wanda Farris agreed to be interviewed and spoke about her daughter's death. Farris described her daughter as a "happy-go-lucky" girl who was always smiling and loved life, and said that Gray aspired to be a schoolteacher, and she loved participating in the church youth group, took part in the school choir, and subtly defended fellow teenagers who were targeted by the bullies. Farris, who believed in the death penalty and planned to attend Loden's execution, stated that she did not believe Loden's apology, although she had forgiven him years ago for murdering her daughter. Gray's best friend Lisa Darracott, whose maiden name was Sheffield before her marriage, described Gray, whom she met through kindergarten, as "quiet and outgoing" and welcoming to others, and both of them enjoy hanging out with each other, and Darracott also hoped to find closure through Loden's execution.

== Execution ==
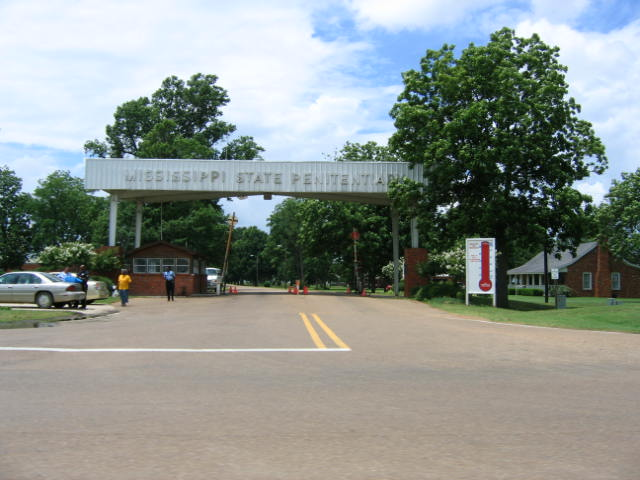
Mississippi State Penitentiary, where Thomas Loden Jr. was put to death 22 years after he murdered Leesa Gray.

On December 14, 2022, 58-year-old Thomas Edwin Loden Jr. was formally put to death via lethal injection at Mississippi State Penitentiary. When asked if he had any last words before the execution procedure commenced, Loden expressed remorse for the rape and murder of Leesa Marie Gray, stating that he wished for the family of Gray to find peace and closure, and that he had tried to make up for his crimes by doing every good deed he could for the past 21 years of his life in prison. He concluded his final words by saying "I love you" in Japanese. Loden was pronounced dead at 6:12 p.m. by Sunflower County Coroner Heather Burton.

For his last meal, Loden ordered fried pork chops, fried okra, a baked sweet potato, Pillsbury Grands biscuits with butter and molasses, peach cobbler with French vanilla ice cream and a Lipton sweet tea. Corrections Commissioner Burl Cain revealed that despite having complained of having too much syrup, Loden was able to finish his final meal.

In a news conference, Parchman Superintendent Marc McClure stated that Loden, who did not plan or submit any last-minute appeals to delay his execution, was in good spirits and resigned to his imminent fate. Several protestors who opposed the execution of Loden gathered outside the prison and the mansion of the Mississippi governor Tate Reeves to protest against the execution, while members of the Bethel Baptist Church, where Gray frequented to before her death, held a vigil session and wore purple clothes in remembrance of Gray.

Thomas Edwin Loden Jr. was the second condemned person to be executed in Mississippi after the state's resumption of executions in 2021 and was the 23rd person to be executed in Mississippi since 1983 after the U.S. resumed the use of capital punishment in 1976.

== See also ==
- Capital punishment in Mississippi
- List of people executed in Mississippi
- List of kidnappings (2000–2009)
- List of people executed in the United States in 2022

Executions carried out in Mississippi
Preceded by David Neal Cox November 17, 2021	Thomas Edwin Loden Jr. December 14, 2022	Succeeded by Richard Gerald Jordan June 25, 2025
Executions carried out in the United States
Preceded by Kevin Johnson Jr. – Missouri November 29, 2022	Thomas Edwin Loden Jr. – Mississippi; December 14, 2022	Succeeded by Amber McLaughlin – Missouri January 3, 2023
