= Mississippi Highway 354 =

State Highway in Mississippi

Mississippi Highway 354

Route information
- Maintained by MDOT
- Length: 2.876 mi (4.628 km)
- Existed: 1956–present

Major junctions
- West end: MS 15 in Walnut
- East end: CR 218 (Old Highway 72) in Chalybeate

Location
- Country: United States
- State: Mississippi
- Counties: Tippah

Highway system
- Mississippi State Highway System; Interstate; US; State
← MS 350	→ MS 355

Mississippi Highway 354 (MS 354) is a short 2.9-mile-long (4.7 km) east–west state highway in Tippah County, Mississippi. Lying in the northern part of the county, it connects the town of Walnut with the community of Chalybeate.

== Route description ==
MS 354 begins in the town of Walnut at an intersection with MS 15, just one-half mile (0.80 km) south of that highway's intersection with US Highway 72 (US 72). It heads east along Commerce Street to pass directly through downtown before crossing some abandoned railroad tracks to travel through neighborhoods. The highway leaves Walnut and heads southeast through farmland, where it crosses Muddy Creek, before winding its way through some wooded hills as it enters the community of Chalybeate. MS 354 passes directly through the center of the community, passing by the school and many old storefronts, before state maintenance (and the MS 354 designation) comes to an end at the intersection with County Road 203 (CR 203); the roadway continues east as CR 218 (Old Highway 72).

The entire length of MS 354 is a rural, two-lane, state highway, located entirely in Tippah County.

== Major intersections ==
The entire route is in Tippah County.

Location	mi	km	Destinations	Notes
Walnut	0.000	0.000	MS 15 / Commerce Street	Western terminus
Walnut	0.115	0.185	MS 777 (Main Street)	Western terminus
Chalybeate	2.876	4.628	CR 218 east (Old Highway 72) CR 203 north	Eastern terminus; end of state maintenance; road continues east as CR 218
1.000 mi = 1.609 km; 1.000 km = 0.621 mi
