= Luther Carlyle Wheeler =

American convicted cop killer executed in Mississippi

- Born: July 28, 1928; Jacksonville, Florida, U.S.
- Died: February 5, 1954 (aged 25); Beaux-Arts Humphreys County Courthouse, Mississippi, U.S. (Note: Wheeler's execution was carried out not in a prison, but in a courthouse using a portable electric chair.)
- Known for: One of the last people executed by electrocution in Mississippi
- Status: Executed by the electric chair
- Conviction: Murder
- Penalty: Death

Luther Carlyle Wheeler (July 28, 1928 – February 5, 1954) was an American convicted murderer who was charged with murdering two police officers in Hattiesburg, Mississippi. On March 9, 1952, Wheeler and his female companion, Elaine Forman, burglarized an automobile company in Hattiesburg, and subsequently engaged in a gunfight with several police officers in pursuit of them. The gunfight led to the deaths of M. W. Vinson Jr. and Jessie James Everett. Wheeler and Forman were both arrested and charged with the double murder, and after separate trials (pertaining to the murder of Everett), Forman was sentenced to life in prison while Wheeler was sentenced to death and executed by the electric chair on February 5, 1954.

== Murders of M. W. Vinson Jr. and Jessie James Everett ==
On the Sunday evening of March 9, 1952, Luther Carlyle Wheeler, a native of Jacksonville, Florida, and his female companion, Elaine Forman, burglarized a local automobile agency in Hattiesburg, Mississippi. The burglary was discovered by the company's owner Ace Weathers, who filed a police report as a result.

Minutes after the report was lodged, two Hattiesburg police officers, Jessie James Everett and M. W. Vinson Jr., arrived at the scene. While scouting the scene, both Weathers and Vinson heard sounds coming from the storeroom, as if someone was inside. Both men went back to the front, and after seeing a car driven by Forman and Wheeler leaving the premises, both Vinson and Everett gave chase in their police car. Eventually, the car stopped outside a grocery store, and Everett came out of the police car to approach the duo's car. When Everett stopped at the passenger side of the car, where Wheeler sat, the latter brandished a gun and shot Everett once in the heart.

After being shot, Everett staggered to the police car and died on the spot. A gunfight sparked between Vinson and Wheeler, and Vinson was killed after sustaining three gunshot wounds from the shoot-out, including one to the cheek just below his right eye, and another in the lower right chest. Both Vinson and Everett were the first two Hattiesburg police officers to be killed in the line of duty. Prior to the murders, Wheeler was previously convicted thrice of burglary in different cases.

Shortly after the shooting, Wheeler was arrested for the double murder, after three patrolling policemen received a report that a man resembling Wheeler was seen attempting to steal an automobile belonging to a local resident named Emmett McKinney. A search was conducted and a gun used in the shooting was recovered by the police. Forman herself was also arrested as an accomplice.

== Trial ==
On March 12, 1952, Luther Wheeler and Elaine Forman were both formally charged with the murders of M. W. Vinson Jr. and Jessie James Everett. The prosecution had expressed their intent to seek the death penalty for the pair. The couple were remanded in jail while pending trial for the double murder, and appointed separate counsel for their upcoming trials. The couple were formally indicted by a grand jury in April 1952.

Wheeler stood trial in May 1952 for the shooting incident. During the trial, the prosecution argued that Wheeler was responsible for the deaths of both Everett and Vinson. Two witnesses, identified as "Mrs. Dan Mooney" and her 13-year-old daughter Joyce, testified that they had seen a green car driving away from the scene where the police officers were shot and murdered. Forman's confession also recounted that she drove a green car for Wheeler on the same day of the murders. Two FBI agents also came to testify in court, and one of them, a ballistics expert, stated that the .38 caliber bullet recovered at the scene of crime matched to the rusty Smith & Wesson gun seized by the police from Wheeler after his arrest for the shooting. The other, a fingerprints analysis expert, stated that fingerprints that belonged to Wheeler were found on the green car sighted at the scene. Despite so, Wheeler denied being the one killing the officers, and claimed that "some men" in the green car were responsible instead.

On May 10, 1952, the jury found Wheeler guilty of murder in the death of one of the murdered officers, Jessie James Everett. Circuit Judge Burkitt Collins sentenced Wheeler to death by the electric chair on the same date of his conviction. Additionally, Judge Collins set an execution date of July 3, 1952, for Wheeler, although the execution would be stayed pending an appeal from Wheeler's defence counsel, who had already drafted a notice of appeal to the Mississippi Supreme Court. Nearly a month after his sentencing, Wheeler was transferred from the Forrest County Jail to the Hinds County Jail in Jackson, Mississippi.

As for Elaine Forman, she first stood trial for charges of murder and burglary on May 13, 1952. However, her trial venue was transferred several times to differing venues. On November 21, 1952, the jury convicted her of the murder of Everett and fixed her sentence at life imprisonment. Her appeal against her sentence was rejected on March 8, 1954. After serving seven years out of her sentence, Forman was released in December 1959 after Governor J. P. Coleman indefinitely suspended her life sentence, on account of her good behaviour in prison.

== Appeals ==
In January 1953, Luther Wheeler filed an appeal to the Mississippi Supreme Court. On March 16, 1953, the Mississippi Supreme Court denied Wheeler's direct appeal against his death sentence.

After the loss of his appeal, the Mississippi Supreme Court signed a death warrant to schedule Wheeler's execution date as May 8, 1953, but on April 20, 1953, the execution was stayed pending an appeal to the U.S. Supreme Court.

On October 19, 1953, the U.S. Supreme Court dismissed Wheeler's appeal.

On December 3, 1953, Wheeler's second appeal was rejected by the U.S. Supreme Court, and the Mississippi Supreme Court was allowed to set a new execution date for Wheeler.

== Execution ==
On January 4, 1954, the Mississippi Supreme Court signed a new death warrant for Wheeler, ordering his death sentence to be carried out on February 5, 1954.

In a last-minute appeal, Wheeler's lawyers argued that Wheeler was mentally insane at the time of the murder and that he was also denied due process during his trial for murdering Jessie Everett. However, two psychiatrists again confirmed that Wheeler was mentally competent to face execution.

On February 5, 1954, 25-year-old Luther Carlyle Wheeler was put to death by the electric chair at the Beaux-Arts Humphreys County Court House. At that time, it was custom for condemned inmates in Mississippi to be executed in the courthouse with the portable electric chair, which was moved from county to county to carry out death sentences (depending on wherever county the inmate's trial took place). Wheeler's execution was attended by a crowd of approximately 300 people, and he reportedly said a five-minute sermon before the chair was activated. Six hours prior to his execution, while still detained in Hinds County Jail, Wheeler ordered a last meal of shrimp cocktail, lettuce and tomato salad, fried chicken, French fried toes, rye bread and butter, a pint of milk and a large pecan pie.

Wheeler was reportedly the last person executed by electrocution in Mississippi. (Note: Based on the ESPY File, Wheeler was the second-to-last person executed by electrocution in the state, followed by convicted murderer James Johnson on November 10, 1954. However, it was likely inaccurate as Johnson's execution did not occur; his murder conviction was overturned by the Mississippi Supreme Court after an appeal in February 1955.) The following year, in 1955, the state of Mississippi switched from the electric chair to the lethal gas chamber as a new execution method, and Gerald Albert Gallego became the first condemned inmate to be executed in the gas chamber.

== See also ==
- Capital punishment in Mississippi
- List of people executed by electrocution
- List of people executed in Mississippi (pre-1972)
- List of people executed in the United States in 1954
