= Kevin Johnson Jr. =

American man executed in Missouri (1985–2022)

- Born: September 23, 1985; St. Louis County, Missouri, U.S.
- Died: November 29, 2022 (aged 37); Eastern Reception, Diagnostic and Correctional Center, Missouri, U.S.
- Children: 1
- Conviction: First degree murder
- Penalty: Death by lethal injection

Details
- Victims: 1
- Date: July 5, 2005

Kevin Johnson Jr. (September 23, 1985 – November 29, 2022) was an American man executed in Missouri for the 2005 murder of police officer William McEntee. Johnson's case has partly drawn attention because his daughter, Khorry Ramney, was not allowed to witness her father's execution due to her age (19), the same age Johnson was when he committed the crime for which he was sentenced to death. Indeed, a law in Missouri prohibited people under the age of 21 from attending an execution.

== Murder ==
On July 5, 2005, police officers including William McEntee were looking for Kevin Johnson for an alleged breach of his probation. While searching Johnson's house, his 12-year-old brother, "Bam Bam", began having a seizure. According to Johnson, police blocked Johnson's family from providing him with sufficient medical treatment, and he eventually died in hospital. Johnson therefore blamed the police, believing that they were indirectly responsible for the death of his little brother.

Later that evening, one of those officers, Sgt. William McEntee, 43, returned to Meacham Park. He had offered to take a fireworks complaint from another officer because he was closer to the area. Suddenly, Johnson opened fire on McEntee, hitting him multiple times. McEntee drove a short distance, crashed, and fell out of the car. Johnson walked over and shot him again. McEntee later died in hospital.

== Execution ==
Johnson's lawyers claimed racism played a role in his death sentence, as Johnson was black, and McEntee was white. Additionally, the prosecutor who sought a death sentence against Johnson, Bob McCulloch, reportedly requested death sentences in police officer murder cases where the defendants were black but had not done so for the only white defendant in such a case. The courts rejected the defense and declined to halt the execution.

Johnson's daughter, 19-year-old Khorry Ramey, asked the courts to allow her to witness her father's execution. Her request was ultimately denied after a judge upheld a law that stated Ramey was too young. Missouri law requires a person to be aged 21 or older in order to view an execution.

Johnson was executed on November 29, 2022, via lethal injection. In his final statement, he apologized to McEntee's family as well as his own. In a first in Missouri execution history, Johnson was accompanied by his spiritual adviser during the execution procedure.

== See also ==
- List of people executed in Missouri
- List of people executed in the United States in 2022

Executions carried out in Missouri
Preceded by Carman Deck May 3, 2022	Kevin Johnson Jr. November 29, 2022	Succeeded by Amber McLaughlin January 3, 2023
Executions carried out in the United States
Preceded by Richard Fairchild – Oklahoma November 17, 2022	Kevin Johnson Jr. – Missouri; November 29, 2022	Succeeded by Thomas Edwin Loden Jr. – Mississippi December 14, 2022
