= North Tippah School District =

School district in Mississippi

Address
- 20821 Hwy 15 Tiplersville, Tippah County, Mississippi; United States

District information
- Grades: PreK–12
- Schools: 3
- NCES District ID: 2803270

Students and staff
- Students: 1,287
- Teachers: 107.17 FTE
- Student–teacher ratio: 12.01:1

Other information
- Website: www.northtippah.org

The North Tippah School District is a public school district based in the community of Tiplersville, Mississippi (USA).

In addition to Tiplersville, the district serves the towns of Walnut and Falkner, the unincorporated community of Chalybeate as well as rural areas in northern Tippah County.

== Schools ==
- Falkner High School
- Falkner Elementary School
- Chalybeate Elementary School
- Walnut Attendance Center

== Demographics ==
=== 2006-07 school year ===
There were a total of 1,385 students enrolled in the North Tippah School District during the 2006–2007 school year. The gender makeup of the district was 49% female and 51% male. The racial makeup of the district was 11.12% African American, 86.71% White, 1.73% Hispanic, 0.29% Native American, and 0.14% Asian. 51.7% of the district's students were eligible to receive free lunch.

=== Previous school years ===
School Year	Enrollment	Gender Makeup		Racial Makeup				
School Year	Enrollment	Female	Male	Asian	African American	Hispanic	Native American	White
2005-06	1,345	48%	52%	0.30%	12.42%	1.64%	0.30%	85.35%
2004-05	1,309	48%	52%	0.31%	12.61%	1.91%	–	85.18%
2003-04	1,357	47%	53%	0.29%	12.90%	1.40%	–	85.41%
2002-03	1,321	47%	53%	0.38%	13.17%	1.06%	–	85.39%

== Accountability statistics ==
	2006-07	2005-06	2004-05	2003-04	2002-03
District Accreditation Status	Accredited	Accredited	Accredited	Accredited	Accredited
School Performance Classifications
Level 5 (Superior Performing) Schools	1	1	4	3	3
Level 4 (Exemplary) Schools	2	3	0	1	1
Level 3 (Successful) Schools	1	0	0	0	0
Level 2 (Under Performing) Schools	0	0	0	0	0
Level 1 (Low Performing) Schools	0	0	0	0	0
Not Assigned	0	0	0	0	0

== See also ==
- List of school districts in Mississippi
