= List of people executed in Mississippi =

The following is a list of people executed by the U.S. state of Mississippi since capital punishment was resumed in the United States in 1976.

Since 1976, 25 people convicted of capital murder have been executed by the state of Mississippi. Of the 25 people executed, 4 were executed via gas chamber and 21 via lethal injection.

== List of people executed in Mississippi since 1976 ==
No.	Name	Race	Age	Sex	Date of execution	County	Method	Victim(s)	Governor
1	Jimmy Lee Gray	White	34	M	September 2, 1983	Jackson	Gas chamber (Note: Since the reinstatement of the death penalty in 1976, Mississippi is the state with the highest amount of executions via gas chamber.)	Deressa Jean Scales (Note: Also killed Elda Louise Prince in Arizona, but was executed for killing Scales.)	William F. Winter
2	Edward Earl Johnson	Black	26	M	May 20, 1987	Leake	Gas chamber	Walnut Grove police officer J. T. Trest	William Allain
3	Connie Ray Evans	Black	27	M	July 8, 1987	Hinds	Gas chamber	Arun Pahwa	William Allain
4	Leo E. Edwards Jr.	Black	36	M	June 21, 1989	Hinds	Gas chamber	Linzy Don Dixon	Ray Mabus
5	Tracy Alan Hansen	White	39	M	July 17, 2002	Harrison	Lethal injection	Mississippi Highway Patrol officer David Bruce Ladner	Ronnie Musgrove
6	Jessie Derrell Williams	White	51	M	December 11, 2002	Jackson	Lethal injection	Karon Ann Pierce	Ronnie Musgrove
7	John B. Nixon Sr.	White	77	M	December 14, 2005	Rankin	Lethal injection	Virginia Tucker	Haley Barbour
8	Bobby Glen Wilcher	White	43	M	October 18, 2006	Scott	Lethal injection	Katie Bell Moore and Velma Odell Noblin	Haley Barbour
9	Earl Wesley Berry	White	49	M	May 21, 2008	Chickasaw	Lethal injection	Mary Bounds	Haley Barbour
10	Dale Leo Bishop	White	34	M	July 23, 2008	Lee	Lethal injection	Marcus James Gentry	Haley Barbour
11	Paul Everette Woodward	White	62	M	May 19, 2010	Perry	Lethal injection	Rhonda Crane	Haley Barbour
12	Gerald James Holland	White	72	M	May 20, 2010	Harrison	Lethal injection	Krystal King	Haley Barbour
13	Joseph Daniel Burns	White	42	M	July 21, 2010	Lee	Lethal injection	Floyd Melvin McBride	Haley Barbour
14	Benny Joe Stevens	White	52	M	May 10, 2011	Marion	Lethal injection	4 murder victims (Note: The 4 victims were: Glenda Reid, Wesley Lee Reid, Dylan Lee, and Heath Pounds.)	Haley Barbour
15	Rodney Gray	Black	39	M	May 17, 2011	Newton	Lethal injection	Grace Blackwell	Haley Barbour
16	Edwin Hart Turner	White	38	M	February 8, 2012	Carroll	Lethal injection	Eddie Brooks and Everett Curry	Phil Bryant
17	Larry Matthew Puckett	White	35	M	March 20, 2012	Forrest	Lethal injection	Rhonda Hatten Griffis	Phil Bryant
18	William Gerald Mitchell	Black	61	M	March 22, 2012	Harrison	Lethal injection	Patty Milliken	Phil Bryant
19	Henry Curtis Jackson	Black	47	M	June 5, 2012	Leflore	Lethal injection	4 murder victims (Note: The 4 victims were: Shunterica Lonnett Jackson, Dominique Devro Jackson, Antonio Terrell Jackson, and Andrew Odutola Kuyoro Jr.)	Phil Bryant
20	Jan Michael Brawner	White	34	M	June 12, 2012	Tate	Lethal injection	4 murder victims (Note: The 4 victims were: Candice Paige Brawner, Barbara Faye Brawner, Carl Albert Craft, and Martha Jane Craft.)	Phil Bryant
21	Gary Carl Simmons Jr.	White	49	M	June 20, 2012	Jackson	Lethal injection	Jeffrey Wolfe	Phil Bryant
22	David Neal Cox Sr.	White	50	M	November 17, 2021	Union	Lethal injection	Kim Kirk Cox (Note: Also killed Felicia Cox, but was executed for killing Kim Cox.)	Tate Reeves
23	Thomas Edwin Loden Jr.	White	58	M	December 14, 2022	Itawamba	Lethal injection	Leesa Marie Gray	Tate Reeves
24	Richard Gerald Jordan	White	79	M	June 25, 2025	Harrison	Lethal injection	Edwina Rose Marter	Tate Reeves
25	Charles Ray Crawford	White	59	M	October 15, 2025	Tippah	Lethal injection	Kristy Denice Ray	Tate Reeves

== Demographics ==
Race
White	19	76%
Black	6	24%
Age
20–29	2	8%
30–39	8	32%
40–49	5	20%
50–59	5	20%
60–69	2	8%
70–79	3	12%
Sex
Male	25	100%
Date of execution
1976–1979	0	0%
1980–1989	4	16%
1990–1999	0	0%
2000–2009	6	24%
2010–2019	11	44%
2020–2029	4	16%
Method
Lethal injection	21	84%
Gas chamber	4	16%
Governor (Party)
Cliff Finch (D)	0	0%
William F. Winter (D)	1	4%
William Allain (D)	2	8%
Ray Mabus (D)	1	4%
Kirk Fordice (R)	0	0%
Ronnie Musgrove (D)	2	8%
Haley Barbour (R)	9	36%
Phil Bryant (R)	6	24%
Tate Reeves (R)	4	16%
Total	25	100%

== See also ==
- Capital punishment in Mississippi
- Capital punishment in the United States
- List of people executed in Mississippi (pre-1972) – executions before Furman
