= Scott McLaughlin (disambiguation) =

Scott McLaughlin (born 1993) is a New Zealand racing driver.

Scott McLaughlin may also refer to:

- Scott McLaughlin (footballer) (born 1984), Scottish football midfielder
- Scott A. McLaughlin, birth name of Amber McLaughlin (1973–2023), American convicted murderer
