= List of Mississippi State Bulldogs men's basketball head coaches =

Mississippi State University has had 20 head coaches in the entire 100 year history of the men's basketball program.

== Head coaches ==
Coach	Alma mater	First Year	Last Year	Years	Overall Games				SEC Games			
Coach	Alma mater	First Year	Last Year	Years	Games	Won	Loss	Pct.	Games	Won	Loss	Pct.
T.H. Werner	Chicago	1909	1909	1	10	5	5	.500				
W.D. Chadwick	Marietta	1911	1911	1	6	2	4	.333				
Earl C. Hayes	Albion	1912	1924	12	178	124	54	.697				
K. P. Gatchell	Miss State	1925	1925	1	23	14	9	.609				
Bernie Bierman	Minnesota	1926	1927	2	46	31	15	.674				
Ray G. Dauber	Iowa	1928	1933	5	90	37	53	.411	12	3	9	.250
Edwin Hale	Miss College	1934	1935	2	37	20	17	.541	22	9	13	.409
Frank Carideo	Notre Dame	1936	1939	4	82	43	39	.524	58	27	31	.466
Stanfield Hitt	Miss College	1940	1947	7	137	68	69	.496	96	41	55	.427
Paul Gregory	Miss State	1948	1955	8	158	58	100	.367	116	33	83	.284
Babe McCarthy	Miss State	1956	1965	10	254	169	85	.665	142	88	54	.620
Joe Dan Gold	Miss State	1966	1970	5	125	51	74	.408	88	32	56	.364
Kermit Davis Sr.	Miss State	1971	1977	7	182	91	91	.500	126	44	82	.349
Ron Greene	Murray State	1978	1978	1	27	18	9	.667	18	13	5	.722
Jim Hatfield	East Tenn St	1979	1981	3	82	40	42	.488	54	21	33	.349
Bob Boyd	USC	1982	1986	5	142	55	87	.387	90	29	61	.322
Richard Williams	Miss State	1987	1998	12	354	191	163	.540	202	89	113	.441
Rick Stansbury	Campbellsville	1999	2012	14	458	293	165	.641	224	122	102	.545
Rick Ray	Grand View	2012	2015	3	92	36	56	.391	50	12	38	.240
Ben Howland	Weber State	2015	2022	7	232	134	98	.578	126	59	67	.468
Chris Jans	Loras College	2022	Present									
Totals		1909	Present	108+	2671	1456	1215	.545	1402	612	790	.437

- All Stats updated through the 2021 season (as of 2/24/2021).
