= Murder in Mississippi =

Murder in Mississippi may refer to:

- Murder in Mississippi law
- Murder in Mississippi (painting), a 1965 painting by Norman Rockwell
- Murder in Mississippi (film), a 1990 television film directed by Roger Young
- Murder in Mississippi (book), a 2013 true crime book by John Safran, also published as God'll Cut You Down

== See also ==
- Pages in the category Murder in Mississippi
- Crime in Mississippi
