= WLRC =

Coordinates: 34°56′46″N 88°52′44″W

- Walnut, Mississippi; United States
- Frequency: 850 kHz
- Branding: 85 Alive WLRC

Programming
- Format: Brokered religious

Ownership
- Owner: Martha S. Clayton and Christopher R. Clayton

History
- First air date: February 22, 1982
- Call sign meaning: Living Risen Christ

Technical information
- Licensing authority: FCC
- Facility ID: 3494
- Class: D
- Power: 940 watts (days only)

Links
- Public license information: Public file; LMS
- Website: wlrcradio.com

WLRC is a radio station airing a brokered religious format licensed to Walnut, Mississippi, broadcasting on 850 AM. The station is owned by Martha S. Clayton and Christopher R. Clayton.
