= David Neal Cox =

American murderer (1970–2021)

- David Neal Cox prior his execution
- Born: David Neal Cox Sr. November 30, 1970; Mississippi, U.S.
- Died: November 17, 2021 (aged 50); Mississippi State Penitentiary, Sunflower County, Mississippi, U.S.
- Cause of death: Execution by lethal injection
- Convictions: Capital murder (x1); Kidnapping (x2); Sexual battery (x3); Burglary (x1); Discharge of firearms (x1)
- Penalty: 185 years' imprisonment (kidnapping, discharge of firearms, burglary and sexual battery); Death (murder)

Details
- Victims: Felicia Cox, 40; Kim Kirk Cox, 40
- Date: July 2007 – May 14, 2010
- Location: Union County, Mississippi
- Imprisoned at: Mississippi State Penitentiary

David Neal Cox Sr. (November 30, 1970 – November 17, 2021) was an American convicted murderer who killed his wife, Kim Cox, by shooting her. Cox was arrested hours after the killing and was charged with capital murder, sexual battery, and several other offenses. Cox pleaded guilty to all eight charges and was sentenced to death in 2012. While on death row, Cox confessed to murdering his sister-in-law in 2007. Cox waived his right to appeal and was executed via lethal injection on November 17, 2021, becoming the first person to be executed in Mississippi in over nine years.

== Background ==
Cox was born on November 30, 1970, and worked as a truck driver. He had two sons with his wife, Kim, who also had a daughter from a previous relationship. In August 2009, Cox's stepdaughter reported him to the police and stated that Cox was sexually abusive towards her. As a result, Cox was arrested on multiple charges, including statutory rape, sexual battery, child abuse, possession of precursors, and possession of methamphetamine.

== Murder of Kim Cox ==
During the nine months he spent in jail before posting bond, Cox frequently expressed his anger to his cellmates, blaming Kim for his situation and declaring that he would kill her once he was free. Out of fear for her safety, Kim and the children moved in with her sister in the small town of Sherman, Mississippi. When Cox was released in April 2010 after being granted bail, he decided to confront Kim with a gun on May 14, 2010, when he purchased a .40 caliber handgun and extra ammunition. Cox subsequently drove a van to the house of Kim's sister.

After breaking into the house of Kim's sister, Cox confronted his wife, her sister, his two sons, and his stepdaughter at gunpoint, and fired his gun inside the house. Although Kim's sister and one of Cox's sons managed to escape the house, Cox held his other son, stepdaughter, and wife hostage for over eight hours.

Cox then shot Kim in the abdomen. While she was mortally wounded and slowly dying from massive blood loss, he sexually assaulted his 12-year-old stepdaughter three times in front of her. Despite attempts from authorities and family members of both Cox and Kim for the former to release the latter for medical treatment, Cox refused and proclaimed he wanted to see Kim slowly die a painful death. The armed hostage-taking incident was defused after a SWAT team entered the house to apprehend Cox at around 3.23 a.m. on the morning of May 15, 2010.

== Trial and sentencing ==
After his arrest, Cox was charged with eight counts, consisting of one count of capital murder, two counts of kidnapping, one count of burglary, one count of firing into a dwelling, and three counts of sexual battery.

On September 17, 2012, a jury trial commenced to hear Cox's case. Cox pleaded guilty to murdering his wife Kim Cox and other charges pertaining to the rapes of his stepdaughter and hostage-taking of his wife's family members, leading to his conviction for all eight charges against him. The prosecution announced their intent to seek the death penalty for Cox in relation to the capital murder charge, which also carried a potential life sentence without any chance for parole if the offender was not sentenced to death.

The trial lasted for five days until September 22, 2012, and the jury unanimously recommended the death penalty for Cox on the most serious charge of capital murder. For the remaining seven charges, Cox received consecutive jail terms of 30 years for each count of kidnapping, 30 years for each count of sexual battery, as well as 25 years for burglary and ten years for discharging a firearm into a dwelling, making it a total of 185 years' imprisonment on top of his death sentence for murdering Kim.

== Appeals and death warrant ==
On February 3, 2015, Cox's appeal against his death sentence was heard before the Mississippi Supreme Court. On June 25, 2015, Cox's appeal was dismissed by the Mississippi Supreme Court.

On February 16, 2016, the Mississippi Supreme Court rejected Cox's second appeal.

In July 2018, Cox wrote a letter to the judge, the district attorney, and his lawyer, in which he admitted to killing his wife and stated he would do it again if given the opportunity. Later that year, Cox sought permission from the Mississippi Supreme Court to dismiss his counsel, waive all appeals, and move forward with his execution. The judges determined that a circuit judge should conduct a competency hearing. During that hearing before Union County Circuit Judge Kent Smith in February 2021, the court heard testimonies from Cox, his family, friends, and two mental health experts. Two months later, on April 5, 2021, Justice Smith approved Cox's request to waive his remaining rights to appeal and was satisfied that Cox was mentally competent to reach this decision. The ruling paved way for the state authorities to schedule an execution date for Cox.

On October 22, 2021, the Mississippi Supreme Court issued an official death warrant for Cox, scheduling his execution to be carried out on November 17, 2021. Cox was the first condemned person from Mississippi to have his execution date set in nine years after the state's last execution in 2012, for which the pause on executions was due to the difficulty finding the drugs necessary to carry out lethal injection executions.

In response to the death warrant of Cox, 23-year-old Lindsey Kirk, who was Cox's stepdaughter, stated that she wanted to attend the execution and wanted Cox to face the consequences of his crime. She also recounted the sexual abuse she experienced before and during the murder of her mother Kim. Benny Kirk, Kim's father, told the press that his son-in-law was "evil" and described Kim as a "caring mother who was generous toward others". Kirk said he and his wife (Kim's stepmother) never realized the abusive nature of Cox towards his daughter and grandchildren until Cox's true colors were exposed.

On the eve of the execution, Mississippi's Governor Tate Reeves confirmed that he would not grant clemency to Cox.

== Execution ==
On November 17, 2021, 50-year-old David Neal Cox Sr. was formally put to death via lethal injection at Mississippi State Penitentiary; two weeks short of his 51st birthday. When asked to make a final statement, he said: "I want my children to know that I love them very much and that I was a good man at one time. Don't ever read anything but the King James Bible." Cox also thanked the state corrections commissioner for being kind to him over the years. He was pronounced dead at 6:12 p.m.

For his last meal, Cox ordered a banana pudding, French fries, fried catfish, and cornmeal. Reportedly, Cox shared his food with Mississippi Department of Corrections Commissioner Burl Cain, two other department of corrections officials, and three chaplains.

Cox was the first person to be executed in Mississippi after the state's nine-year moratorium on capital punishment. The last execution took place in 2012 prior to Cox's execution. Cox was the 18th person in the state to be subjected to execution by lethal injection since 2002.

== Confession of second murder ==
Prior to his execution, Cox admitted that he was responsible for the alleged murder of his sister-in-law Felicia Cox (who was his brother's wife).

Felicia Cox, who was 40 years old at the time of her disappearance, went missing sometime in July 2007. Felicia was last seen alive visiting Cox's wife Kim Cox in Pontotoc County, Mississippi. According to a letter which Cox wrote in October 2021 (a month before he was put to death), Cox admitted to killing Felicia under unspecified circumstances, and he also revealed the location where he buried her body by drawing a map. The police concluded that Cox, who had been a long-time suspect behind his sister-in-law's disappearance, was most likely responsible for the crime.

The Pontotoc County Sheriff's Department, District Attorney's Office, and experts in Archeology and Anthropology affiliated with Mississippi State University participated in the search for Felicia Cox's remains. On December 13, 2021, the authorities were able to locate a set of human remains at the location where Cox reportedly buried his sister-in-law's body.

On December 24, 2021, after DNA tests were conducted, the police confirmed that the corpse belonged to Felicia Cox, after the DNA matched to her daughter Amber Miskelly, who was 18 when her mother disappeared.

== See also ==
- Capital punishment in Mississippi
- List of people executed in Mississippi
- List of people executed in the United States in 2021
- Volunteer (capital punishment)

Executions carried out in Mississippi
Preceded by Gary Carl Simmons Jr. June 20, 2012	David Neal Cox; November 17, 2021	Succeeded by Thomas Edwin Loden Jr. December 14, 2022
Executions carried out in the United States
Preceded by John Grant – Oklahoma October 28, 2021	David Neal Cox – Mississippi; November 17, 2021	Succeeded by Bigler Stouffer – Oklahoma December 9, 2021
