= Amber McLaughlin =

American transgender woman executed in Missouri (1973–2023)

- Born: Scott A. McLaughlin; January 13, 1973; Missouri, U.S.
- Died: January 3, 2023 (aged 49); Eastern Reception, Diagnostic and Correctional Center, Bonne Terre, Missouri, U.S.
- Cause of death: Execution by lethal injection
- Convictions: First degree murder Forcible rape Sexual assault Armed criminal action
- Penalty: Death (2006)

Details
- Victims: Beverly Guenther, 45
- Date: November 20, 2003

Amber McLaughlin (January 13, 1973 – January 3, 2023) was an American murderer executed in Missouri for the 2003 rape and murder of her ex-girlfriend, Beverly Guenther. At the time of the crime, McLaughlin was living as male; she transitioned from male to female while incarcerated. McLaughlin became the first transgender person to be executed in the United States. Her legal name remained her birth name, Scott A. McLaughlin, and she was identified as such in her death warrant and in prison records.

McLaughlin was a registered sex offender because of a 1992 conviction for sexual assault against a 14-year-old girl.

== Murder of Beverly Guenther ==
According to a neighbor, Beverly had been in fear of McLaughlin for months. Beverly had been stalked for months by McLaughlin prior to the murder. She had ordered an order of protection against McLaughlin before she was abducted. She had a police officer escort her to her car for about a week. The day Guenther stopped having an officer escort her, the murder happened. McLaughlin raped Guenther then stabbed her to death and dumped her body in the Mississippi River near St. Louis. Her neighbors called police when she failed to return home. Police went to her car and discovered a broken knife handle and a trail of blood.

At McLaughlin's 2006 trial, the jury was deadlocked on the issue of the death penalty. In most U.S. states, this would result in a sentence of life imprisonment. However, Missouri is one of only two states (the other being Indiana) in which a judge has the discretion to sentence a defendant to death if the jury is deadlocked on the issue of capital punishment.

In August 2021, McLaughlin's sentence was reinstated by the United States Court of Appeals for the Eighth Circuit. On January 3, 2023, McLaughlin was executed by the state. McLaughlin submitted a final statement that read: “I am sorry for what I did. I am a loving and caring person.”

== See also ==
- Capital punishment in Missouri
- List of people executed in Missouri
- List of people executed in the United States in 2023
- List of women executed in the United States since 1976

Executions carried out in Missouri
Preceded by Kevin Johnson Jr. November 29, 2022	Amber McLaughlin; January 3, 2023	Succeeded by Leonard Taylor February 7, 2023
Executions carried out in the United States
Preceded by Thomas Edwin Loden Jr. – Mississippi December 14, 2022	Amber McLaughlin – Missouri; January 3, 2023	Succeeded by Robert Fratta – Texas January 10, 2023
Women executed in the United States
Preceded by Lisa Montgomery – Federal government January 13, 2021	Amber McLaughlin – Missouri; January 3, 2023	Succeeded by most recent
