= Falkner, Mississippi =

- Town
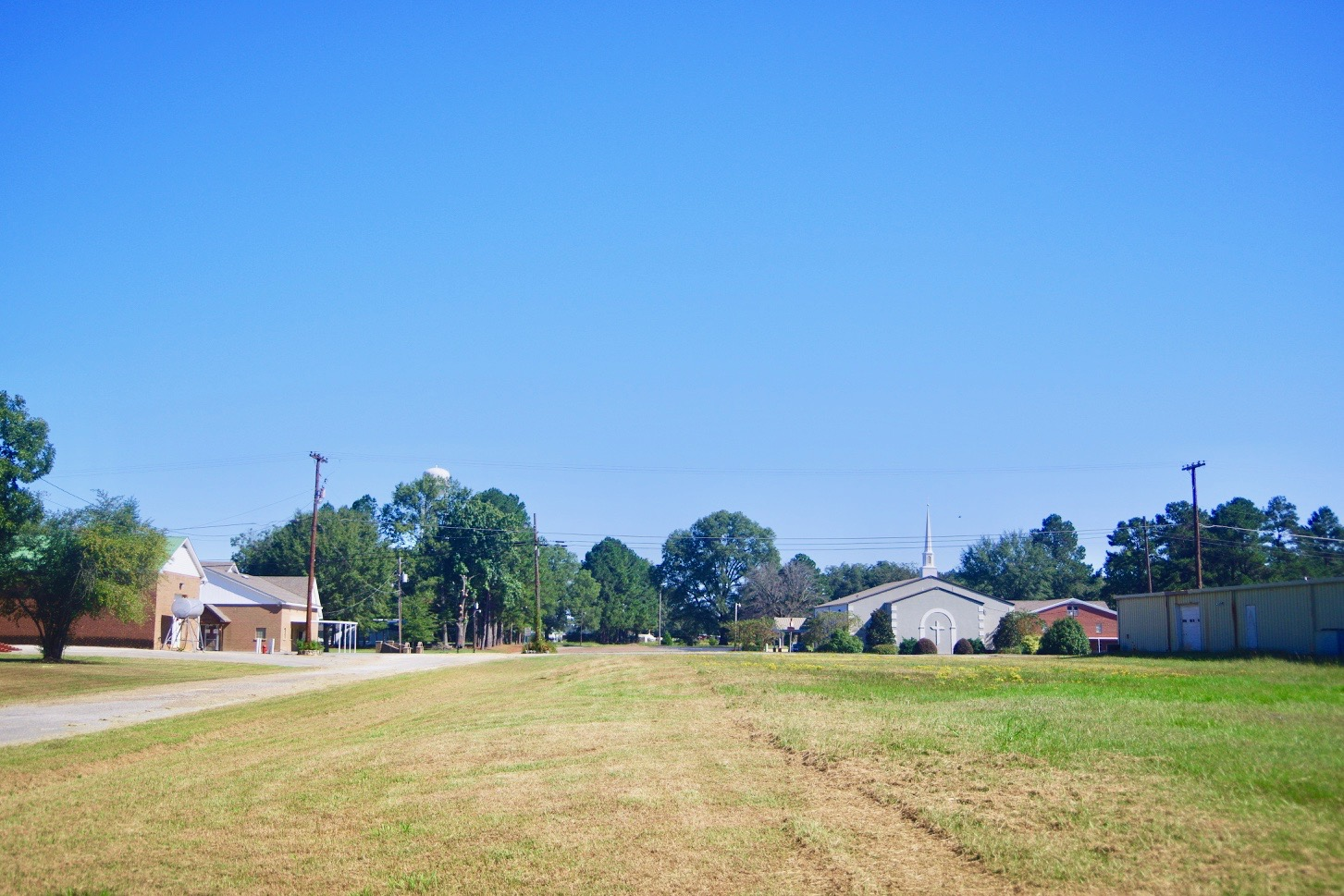
- Falkner

- Location of Falkner, Mississippi

- Location in the United States
- Coordinates: 34°50′17″N 88°56′33″W
- Country: United States
- State: Mississippi
- County: Tippah

Area
  - Total: 5.07 sq mi (13.13 km^{2})
  - Land: 5.07 sq mi (13.13 km^{2})
  - Water: 0 sq mi (0.00 km^{2})
- Elevation: 453 ft (138 m)

Population (2020)
  - Total: 437
  - Density: 86.2/sq mi (33.28/km^{2})
- Time zone: UTC-6 (Central (CST))
  - Summer (DST): UTC-5 (CDT)
- ZIP code: 38629
- Area code: 662
- FIPS code: 28-24220
- GNIS feature ID: 2406487

Falkner is a town in Tippah County, Mississippi, United States. As of the 2020 census, Falkner had a population of 437. The town was named for William Clark Falkner, the great-grandfather of author William Faulkner.

== Geography ==
Falkner lies north of Ripley along Mississippi Highway 15. Just south of Falkner, MS 15 intersects Mississippi Highway 370, which connects it with Ashland to the west.

According to the United States Census Bureau, the town has a total area of 1.1 square miles (2.8 km^{2}), all land.

== Demographics ==
Historical population
Census	Pop.	Note	%±
1910	148		—
1970	159		—
1980	251		57.9%
1990	232		−7.6%
2000	212		−8.6%
2010	514		142.5%
2020	437		−15.0%
U.S. Decennial Census

As of the census of 2000, there were 213 people, 85 households, and 62 families residing in the town. The population density was 199.1 inhabitants per square mile (76.9/km^{2}). There were 90 housing units at an average density of 84.5 per square mile (32.6/km^{2}). The racial makeup of the town was 97.64% White, 0.94% African American, 0.94% from other races, and 0.47% from two or more races. Hispanic or Latino of any race were 2.83% of the population.

There were 85 households, out of which 31.8% had children under the age of 18 living with them, 61.2% were married couples living together, 9.4% had a female householder with no husband present, and 25.9% were non-families. 23.5% of all households were made up of individuals, and 11.8% had someone living alone who was 65 years of age or older. The average household size was 2.47 and the average family size was 2.92.

In the town, the population was spread out, with 22.6% under the age of 18, 9.9% from 18 to 24, 23.1% from 25 to 44, 25.0% from 45 to 64, and 19.3% who were 65 years of age or older. The median age was 42 years. For every 100 females, there were 114.1 males. For every 100 females age 18 and over, there were 105.0 males.

The median income for a household in the town was $28,750, and the median income for a family was $38,036. Males had a median income of $25,000 versus $19,167 for females. The per capita income for the town was $16,946. About 6.3% of families and 10.8% of the population were below the poverty line, including 8.9% of those under the age of eighteen and none of those 65 or over.

== Education ==
The Town of Falkner is served by the North Tippah School District.
