= Kermit Davis Sr. =

American college basketball player and coach (1935–2026)

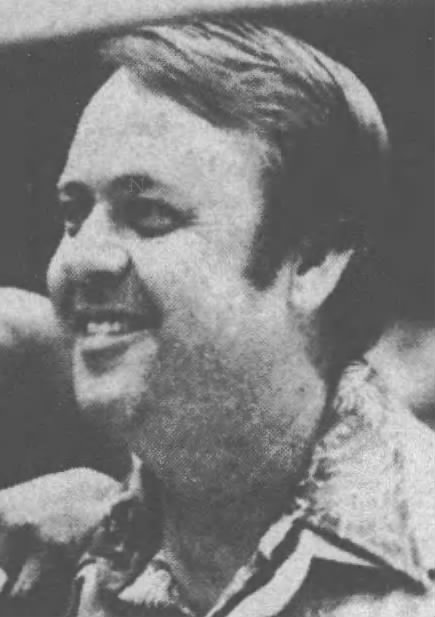
- Davis in 1977

Biographical details
- Born: August 2, 1935; Walnut, Mississippi, U.S.
- Died: August 10, 2026 (aged 91); Tupelo, Mississippi, U.S.

Playing career
- 1955–1959: Mississippi State

Coaching career (HC unless noted)
- 1962–1966: Tupelo HS (MS)
- 1966–1970: Mississippi State (assistant)
- 1970–1977: Mississippi State

Head coaching record
- Overall: 91–91 (college)

Accomplishments and honors

Awards
- SEC co-Coach of the Year (1971)

Kermit Davis Sr. (August 2, 1935 – August 10, 2026) was an American college basketball player and coach.

== Early life and career ==
Davis was born in Walnut, Mississippi, the son of John and Pauline Davis. He played high school basketball at Walnut High School from 1951 to 1955. He then enrolled at Mississippi State University to play college basketball for the Mississippi State Bulldogs. He was on the team from 1955 to 1959, and was captain of the team in 1959. He earned his bachelor's degree and his master's degree at Mississippi State, and was an ROTC officer.

Davis served as head coach of the basketball team at Tupelo High School from 1962 to 1966, compiling a record of 131–23 in four seasons. He then served as assistant coach for the Bulldogs at his alma mater from 1966 until 1970, when he was named head coach of the team. In 1971, he was named SEC co-Coach of the Year. He compiled a record of 91–91 in seven seasons, and in 1977, he resigned.

In 2022, Davis was inducted into the Mississippi Sports Hall of Fame.

== Personal life and death ==
Davis was married to Nancy Jo Hogan. They had three children, including Kermit Jr., a college basketball player and coach. Their marriage lasted until Davis's death in 2026.

Davis died in Tupelo, Mississippi on August 10, 2026, at the age of 91.
