= Will Purvis =

American white supremacist (1872–1938)

William Isaac Purvis (September 27, 1872 – October 13, 1938) was a member of the White Caps, a white supremacist group with foundations similar to the Ku Klux Klan. He was convicted of the murder of Will Buckley, a fellow White Cap, in 1894. In 1893, the Buckley family's black farmhand was flogged by a group of the White Caps. In retaliation, Buckley reported the incident and vowed to testify against in front of a grand jury in Marion County, Mississippi. While riding home, Buckley, accompanied by his brother Jim and their farmhand, was shot and killed along a road leading to the Purvis home.

Purvis would be sentenced to death by hanging despite his claims of innocence. However, when officials attempted to carry out his death sentence on February 7, 1894, he survived when the noose loosened around his neck. The mob threatened to riot when the sheriff tried to hang him again. In June 1895, a court resentenced Purvis to death. The Supreme Court of Mississippi upheld the sentence in November 1895. However, a week later, a group of sympathizers helped Purvis escape from prison and hid him in the forest for four months. After the election of a new governor, Anselm J. McLaurin, four months later, Purvis surrendered to the sheriff. Governor McLaurin commuted his sentence to life in prison.

Two years later, Jim Buckley admitted that his identification of Purvis as his brother's killer was a mistake. Since almost the entire prosecution's case had rested on his testimony, Governor McLaurin granted an unconditional pardon to Purvis on December 19, 1898.

While he was free, Purvis continued to maintain that he had been wrongfully convicted. In 1917, Purvis' innocence was finally proven. On his deathbed, another man, Joe Beard, confessed that he had been involved in the ambush and identified the killer as Louis Thornhill. Thornhill had never been tried and had died years before. Due to Beard's confession, Purvis was given $5,000 in restitution by the Mississippi Legislature for his wrongful conviction and imprisonment.

== See also ==
- List of wrongful convictions in the United States
