= Tiplersville, Mississippi =

- Unincorporated community
- Location within Mississippi Location within the United States
- Coordinates: 34°53′44″N 88°54′27″W
- Country: United States
- State: Mississippi
- County: Tippah
- Elevation: 446 ft (136 m)
- Time zone: UTC-6 (Central (CST))
  - Summer (DST): UTC-5 (CDT)
- ZIP code: 38674
- Area code: 662
- GNIS feature ID: 694982

Tiplersville is an unincorporated community in Tippah County, Mississippi, United States.
