= Chalybeate, Mississippi =

Coordinates: 34°55′49″N 88°52′05″W

Chalybeate
- Census-designated place
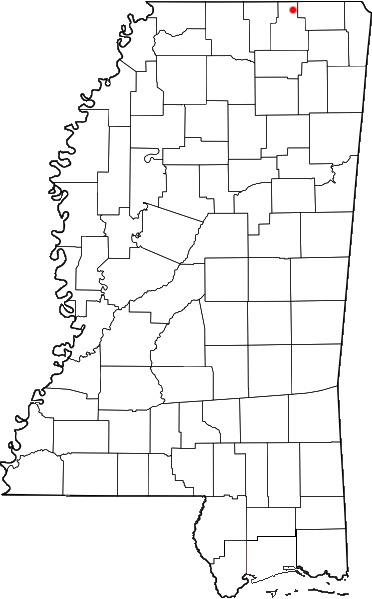
- Location of Chalybeate, Mississippi
- Country: United States
- State: Mississippi
- Counties: Tippah
- Elevation: 492 ft (150 m)
- Time zone: UTC-6 (Central (CST))
  - Summer (DST): UTC-5 (CDT)
- FIPS code: 28-12780
- GNIS feature ID: 2812744

Chalybeate is a census-designated place and unincorporated community in Tippah County, Mississippi, United States. Per the 2020 Census, the population was 170.

== History ==
Chalybeate is located in the northern part of Tippah County, just east of Walnut on Highway 354. The small town was first called Chalybeate Springs because of an iron-enriched spring located there. The word "chalybeate" is Latin and means full of iron. From the very beginning, the water from the springs was considered to be beneficial to health, and the community was considered a health resort at one time. Chalybeate's beginnings stemmed from the community of Jonesborough, which was founded prior to 1840. Jonesborough became extinct shortly after the Civil War, when the merchants in the town were unable to compete with newer and larger stores located a short distance away in Chalybeate.

Chalybeate has always been known for the excellent education it provides for its residents and surrounding communities. The first school was founded in 1889, when J. Finch Ray recognized a need for a school in the area and set out to obtain excellent teachers. He and other town leaders developed a stock company and sold shares to finance the school. The school was named Chalybeate Springs Institute and operated under that name until 1900, when it became Chalybeate Springs High School. In 1957, Chalybeate school consolidated with Walnut and today it only serves ages kindergarten through the eighth grade.

The town was a thriving community for years, and at one time had a boarding house for teachers at the school and for persons wanting to drink the spring water. It was operated by Mr. and Mrs. D. B. Bobo and later by Mr. and Mrs. W. A. Bobo.

A mercantile firm of McBride and Wiggs (January 1899 – 1928) built up a big business. Later, another firm, Clemmer and son, had a good business also. Later another mercantile firm was owned and operated by R. L. Clemmer and W. A. Bobo.

J. F. Ray had a saddle and harness shop at the place where Chalybeate Baptist Church is now located, and he had a tan yard back of what is now the school gymnasium.

Henry Luftenberg operated the harness and saddle shop and Alexandria McKenzie the tan yard. For many years, the village operated a sawmill when lumber was plentiful: and a cotton gin did a thriving business for years.

Chalybeate Bank operated for a number of years under the presidency of W. E. Clemmer. It was forced to close down during the depression.

Early physicians in Jonesborough and Chalybeate were Dr. A. W. Whitten, Dr. A. J. Whitner, Dr. Hughey Giles, Dr. G. W. Scalley, Dr. E. J. Green and Dr. J. W. McIntyre.

Many of the early settlers came from the Carolinas and were the Whittens, Rays, Powells, Hollis, Garretts, Bobos, Hortons, Wilbanks, Gibbs, Richardsons, and Clemmers.

Today, although the school and churches still thrive in Chalybeate, the town itself is a grouping of empty buildings, some of which just recently burned. A small country store is all that remains in operation in the business district. Several old two-story homes and a beautiful church remain near the town center.

The community is served by ZIP Code 38683 and Area Code 662, Exchange 223.

== Demographics ==
Historical population
Census	Pop.	Note	%±
2020	170		—
U.S. Decennial Census; 2020

Chalybeate was first listed as a census designated place in the 2020 U.S. census.

=== 2020 census ===
Chalybeate CDP, Mississippi – Racial and ethnic composition Note: the US Census treats Hispanic/Latino as an ethnic category. This table excludes Latinos from the racial categories and assigns them to a separate category. Hispanics/Latinos may be of any race.
Race / Ethnicity (NH = Non-Hispanic)	Pop 2020	% 2020
White alone (NH)	156	91.76%
Black or African American alone (NH)	1	0.59%
Native American or Alaska Native alone (NH)	0	0.00%
Asian alone (NH)	0	0.00%
Native Hawaiian or Pacific Islander alone (NH)	0	0.00%
Other race alone (NH)	3	1.76%
Mixed race or Multiracial (NH)	5	2.94%
Hispanic or Latino (any race)	5	2.94%
Total	170	100.00%

== Geology ==
The area's Tertiary Clayton formation consists of limestone and marl. The limestone is marked by Turritella fossils, and named for them, with yellow sandy marl on top of it. At Chalybeate Spring, this marl is exposed.

== Education ==
The community has a school, Chalybeate Elementary, which is part of the North Tippah School District and serves students in grades kindergarten through eight.
