= Gerald Albert Gallego =

American criminal (1928–1955)

- Born: April 29, 1928; Hawthorne, California, U.S.
- Died: March 3, 1955 (aged 26); Mississippi State Penitentiary, Mississippi, U.S.
- Children: Gerald Gallego (son)
- Status: Executed by gas chamber
- Conviction: Murder
- Penalty: Death

Details
- Victims: 2 (Note: Not including an alleged third victim Gallego confessed to killing whose identity was never discovered.)
- Date: May 27, 1954; September 10, 1954
- Country: United States
- State: Mississippi
- Date apprehended: May 28, 1954; September 15, 1954

Gerald Albert Gallego (April 29, 1928 – March 3, 1955) was an American murderer who was executed in Mississippi for the May 1954 murder of Ocean Springs police officer Ernest Floyd Beaugez. Gallego had been avoiding a parole violation charge in California when he kidnapped Beaugez after a traffic stop and then fatally shot him multiple times. Sentenced to death in June 1954, Gallego and another inmate later overpowered and killed jailer J.C. Landrum before escaping. They were recaptured after five days on the run and afterwards Gallego confessed to having killed a third victim in Los Angeles, but authorities were never able to conclude the victim's identity. He was executed via the gas chamber on March 3, 1955, becoming the first person executed in Mississippi with the method.

Gallego was the father of serial killer Gerald Armond Gallego, who murdered ten people between 1978 and 1980 with the help of Charlene Williams, the younger Gallego's wife.

== Crimes ==
On May 27, 1954, after spending a night out drunk driving, Gallego was pulled over by 34-year-old Ocean Springs police officer Ernest Floyd Beaugez. Accusing Gallego of reckless driving, Beaugez detained him and drove him to Ocean Springs jail. Once there, Gallego managed to overpower Beaugez and stole his firearm, demanding he changed his clothes and then forced him to walk a short distance down a gravel road. He fired one shot at Beaugez which knocked him unconscious, but noticing he was still breathing Gallego fired an additional shot, which proved to be fatal. He subsequently placed Beaugez's body in the back of his police car and drove to a bushy area along U.S. Route 90 and dumped it.

After killing Beaugez, Gallego drove to Mobile, Alabama, and robbed a bank of around $1,000. Afterwards, he flagged down a taxi, but police captured him while on route to Moss Point, Mississippi. He was indicted with Beaugez's murder that same day. On June 11, a jury took only twenty-five minutes before finding Gallego guilty of murder, and he was sentenced to death.

On September 10, Gallego and fellow inmate Minor Sorber, who himself was under a death sentence, overpowered and bludgeoned jailer Jack "J.C." Landrum to death. The two escaped from the prison and were on the run for five days, reportedly stealing cars and committing several robberies. The two were recaptured on September 15, and afterwards Gallego confessed to having killed a man sometime "before easter" in Los Angeles. Despite giving a detailed description of the alleged victim, his identity was never discovered. He also told authorities he wished he had killed his own brother, Robert, for turning him in after a parole violation in California, which was why he had fled the state.

== Execution ==
Gallego was executed shortly after 2 p.m. on March 3, 1955, in the gas chamber at Mississippi State Penitentiary. Before his execution, he spoke of accepting Jesus Christ as his savior, claiming not because he was going to die but because he was plagued with guilt.

== Aftermath ==
Before his crimes, and while living in California, Gallego fathered a son, Gerald Armond Gallego, with his then-wife Lorraine. The younger Gallego never met his father and was predominantly raised by Lorraine and her multiple boyfriends, who abused him throughout his youth. Between 1978 and 1980, Gallego and his wife Charlene committed ten murders in a series of crimes known as the "Sex Slave Murders".

In 1981, while awaiting trial, the younger Gallego sent a letter to Mississippi Governor William F. Winter apologizing for his father's actions. In 1983 and 1984, the younger Gallego was sentenced to death in California and Nevada, respectively, but he died prior to his execution in 2002.

== See also ==
- List of people executed in Mississippi (pre-1972)
- List of people executed in the United States in 1955
- Gerald and Charlene Gallego
