= List of people executed in Mississippi (pre-1972) =

The following is a list of people executed by the U. S. state of Mississippi before 1972, when capital punishment was briefly abolished by the Supreme Court's ruling in Furman v. Georgia. For people executed by Mississippi after capital punishment was restored by the Supreme Court's ruling in Gregg v. Georgia (1976), see List of people executed in Mississippi.

== List of people executed in Mississippi before 1972 ==
Name	Race	Age	Sex	Date of execution	Method	Crime	Victim(s)	Governor	Ref.
Gerald Albert Gallego	White	26	M	March 3, 1955	Gas chamber	Murder-Kidnapping	Ernest F. Beaugez, 34, white (policeman) (Note: While on death row, Gallego briefly escaped from custody in September 1954, murdering a jailer, 52-year-old J.C. Landrum, in the process. He also confessed to murdering a man in California.)	Hugh L. White	
Allen Donaldson	Black	28	M	March 4, 1955	Gas chamber	Robbery (Note: Also attempted to murder the victim by smashing her skull and face with a hammer. The victim was in critical condition for several days.)	Estelle Foster, 31, white	Hugh L. White	
August Charles LaFontaine	White	24	M	April 28, 1955	Gas chamber	Murder	Ralph DeLoach, white (inmate)	Hugh L. White	
John E. Wiggins	White	59	M	June 20, 1955	Gas chamber	Murder	Ruth Mack, 36, white (stepdaughter and ex-girlfriend)	Hugh L. White	
Mack C. Lewis	Black	21	M	June 23, 1955	Gas chamber	Murder-Robbery	Kenneth L. Mason, white	Hugh L. White	
Walter Johnson	Black	18	M	August 19, 1955	Gas chamber	Rape	Female, 20, white	Hugh L. White	
Murry Garfield Gilmore	White	32	M	December 9, 1955	Gas chamber	Murder-Robbery	Samuel Coleman Addington, 74, white (Note: Also murdered Addington's wife, 76-year-old Demie Addington.)	Hugh L. White	
Mose Robinson	Black	21	M	December 18, 1955	Gas chamber	Rape	Female, white	Hugh L. White	
Robert Buchanan	Black	35	M	January 3, 1956	Gas chamber	Rape-Robbery	Female, 30, white	Hugh L. White	
Edgar Keeler	Black	38	M	January 27, 1956	Gas chamber	Murder-Robbery	Louis Hutchins	James P. Coleman	
O.C. McNair	Black	24	M	February 17, 1956	Gas chamber	Murder	William Levi Mullican, 64, white (constable)	James P. Coleman	
James Russell	Black	32	M	April 5, 1956	Gas chamber	Murder	Alberta Carroll Russell, black (wife)	James P. Coleman	
Dewey Townsel	Black	26	M	June 22, 1956	Gas chamber	Murder	Sizzie Townsel, black (wife)	James P. Coleman	
Willie D. Jones	Black	31	M	July 13, 1956	Gas chamber	Murder-Robbery	George Fritz, 76, white	James P. Coleman	
Mack Drake	Black	35	M	November 7, 1956	Gas chamber	Rape-Robbery	G. D. Fulmer, elderly, white	James P. Coleman	
Henry Jackson	Black	21	M	November 8, 1956	Gas chamber	Murder	Ollie Mae Jackson, 19, black (wife)	James P. Coleman	
Minor M. Sorber	White	39	M	February 8, 1957	Gas chamber	Murder	Edgar McGraw, white (inmate) (Note: Also confessed to committing a murder-for-hire on behalf of the Mafia in Ohio.)	James P. Coleman	
Joe Louis Thompson	Black	21	M	November 14, 1957	Gas chamber	Murder-Robbery	J.Z. Jones, 51, white	James P. Coleman	
William Alvin Wetzel	White	32	M	January 17, 1958	Gas chamber	Murder	Edgar McGraw, 24, white (inmate)	James P. Coleman	
Jimmy C. Cameron	Black	23	M	May 28, 1958	Gas chamber	Rape	Euna Mae Johnson, 21, white (Note: Serial rapist, also raped two other white women, C.T. Travis and Polly Hales.)	James P. Coleman	
Allen Dean Jr.	Black	23	M	December 19, 1958	Gas chamber	Murder-Rape	Shirley Ann Hayes, 18 months, black	James P. Coleman	
Nathaniel Young	Black	42	M	November 10, 1960	Gas chamber	Rape	Female, 7, black	Ross Barnett	
William Stokes	Black	27	M	April 21, 1961	Gas chamber	Murder	Eula Clark, 45, white	Ross Barnett	
Robert Lee Goldsby	Black	35	M	May 31, 1961	Gas chamber	Murder	Moselle McCorkle Nelms, 30, white	Ross Barnett	
J.W. Simmons	Black	27	M	July 14, 1961	Gas chamber	Murder-Robbery	Hugh O'Reilly, 68, white	Ross Barnett	
Howard Cook	Black	33	M	December 19, 1961	Gas chamber	Rape-Burglary	Mary Evelyn Ledbetter, 24, white	Ross Barnett	
Ellie Lee	Black	31	M	December 20, 1961	Gas chamber	Rape-Burglary	Mary Evelyn Ledbetter, 24, white	Ross Barnett	
Willie Wilson	Black	22	M	May 11, 1962	Gas chamber	Rape-Robbery-Burglary	Esco Broadus, 33, white	Ross Barnett	
Kenneth M. Slyter	White	28	M	March 29, 1963	Gas chamber	Murder-Rape	Sandra Holderfield, 15, white	Ross Barnett	
Willie J. Anderson	Black	22	M	June 14, 1963	Gas chamber	Murder-Robbery	Harry Billings, 51, white	Ross Barnett	
Tim Jackson	Black	22	M	May 1, 1964	Gas chamber	Murder-Rape	JoAnn Jackson, 8, black (Note: Also murdered JoAnn's sister, 6-year-old Jacqueline Jackson.)	Paul B. Johnson Jr.	

== Demographics ==
Race
White	7	23%
Black	24	77%
Age
17–19	1	3%
20–29	17	55%
30–39	11	35%
40–49	1	3%
50–59	1	3%
Gender
Male	31	100%
Female	0	0%
Date of execution
1950–1959	21	68%
1960–1969	10	32%
1970–1972	0	0%
Method
Gas chamber	31	100%
Governor (Party)
Hugh L. White (D)	9	29%
James P. Coleman (R)	12	39%
Ross Barnett (R)	9	29%
Paul B. Johnson Jr. (R)	1	3%

== See also ==
- Capital punishment in the United States
- Capital punishment in Mississippi
- Lists of people executed in the United States
- List of people executed in Mississippi
