= Walnut, Mississippi =

- Town
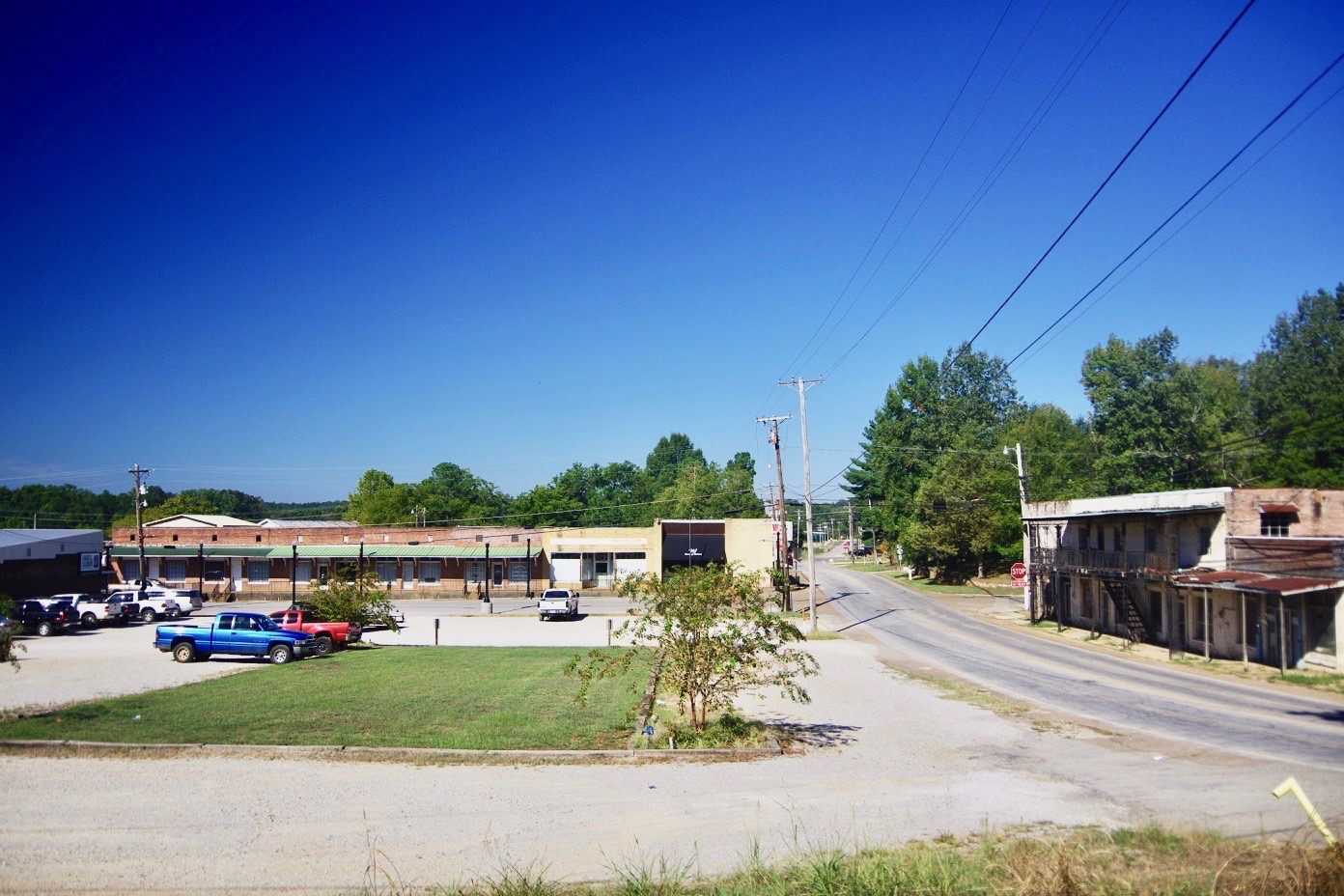
- Walnut

- Flag Logo

- Location of Walnut, Mississippi

- Location in the United States
- Coordinates: 34°56′59″N 88°55′24″W
- Country: United States
- State: Mississippi
- County: Tippah

Area
  - Total: 5.45 sq mi (14.12 km^{2})
  - Land: 5.43 sq mi (14.06 km^{2})
  - Water: 0.023 sq mi (0.06 km^{2})
- Elevation: 466 ft (142 m)

Population (2020)
  - Total: 704
  - Density: 129.7/sq mi (50.08/km^{2})
- Time zone: UTC-6 (Central (CST))
  - Summer (DST): UTC-5 (CDT)
- ZIP code: 38683
- Area code: 662
- FIPS code: 28-77480
- GNIS feature ID: 2406825
- Website: www.walnut.ms

Walnut is a town in Tippah County, Mississippi, United States. As of the 2020 census, Walnut had a population of 704.

== History ==
Walnut was established in 1872 on land belonging to Henry Hopkins, an early settler. The town was initially known as "Hopkins," but was changed to "Walnut" in 1876.

== Geography ==
Walnut is located west of Corinth at the intersection of U.S. Route 72 and Mississippi Highway 15. The town's older business district is concentrated along Mississippi Highway 354, just east of its intersection with MS 15. The town lies just a few miles south of the Mississippi-Tennessee state line, and is located roughly equidistant between Memphis and The Shoals in Alabama.

According to the United States Census Bureau, the town has a total area of 5.4 square miles (14 km^{2}), of which 5.4 square miles (14 km^{2}) is land and 0.04-square-mile (0.10 km^{2}) (0.37%) is water.

== Demographics ==
Historical population
| Census | Pop. | Note | %± |
|---|---|---|---|
| 1920 | 150 | | — |
| 1930 | 219 | | 46.0% |
| 1940 | 516 | | 135.6% |
| 1950 | 481 | | −6.8% |
| 1960 | 390 | | −18.9% |
| 1970 | 458 | | 17.4% |
| 1980 | 513 | | 12.0% |
| 1990 | 523 | | 1.9% |
| 2000 | 754 | | 44.2% |
| 2010 | 771 | | 2.3% |
| 2020 | 704 | | −8.7% |
U.S. Decennial Census

=== 2020 census ===
Note: the US Census treats Hispanic/Latino as an ethnic category. This table excludes Latinos from the racial categories and assigns them to a separate category. Hispanics/Latinos can be of any race.

Walnut racial composition (NH = Non-Hispanic) (Note: Note: the US Census treats Hispanic/Latino as an ethnic category. This table excludes Latinos from the racial categories and assigns them to a separate category. Hispanics/Latinos can be of any race.)
| Race | Number | Percentage |
|---|---|---|
| White (NH) | 539 | 76.56% |
| Black or African American (NH) | 123 | 17.47% |
| Native American or Alaska Native (NH) | 1 | 0.14% |
| Mixed/Multi-Racial (NH) | 30 | 4.26% |
| Hispanic or Latino | 11 | 1.56% |
| Total | 704 | |

As of the 2020 United States census, there were 704 people, 383 households, and 244 families residing in the town.

=== 2000 census ===
As of the census of 2000, there were 754 people, 319 households, and 202 families residing in the town. The population density was 139.1 inhabitants per square mile (53.7/km^{2}). There were 341 housing units at an average density of 62.9 per square mile (24.3/km^{2}). The racial makeup of the town was 84.48% White, 14.46% African American, 0.27% Native American, 0.13% from other races, and 0.66% from two or more races. Hispanic or Latino of any race were 0.66% of the population.

There were 319 households, out of which 30.4% had children under the age of 18 living with them, 45.1% were married couples living together, 14.4% had a female householder with no husband present, and 36.4% were non-families. 35.1% of all households were made up of individuals, and 19.4% had someone living alone who was 65 years of age or older. The average household size was 2.36 and the average family size was 3.06.

In the town, the population was spread out, with 26.9% under the age of 18, 10.6% from 18 to 24, 25.7% from 25 to 44, 19.5% from 45 to 64, and 17.2% who were 65 years of age or older. The median age was 36 years. For every 100 females, there were 81.7 males. For every 100 females age 18 and over, there were 78.9 males.

The median income for a household in the town was $17,102, and the median income for a family was $23,906. Males had a median income of $29,444 versus $17,292 for females. The per capita income for the town was $10,212. About 25.1% of families and 26.4% of the population were below the poverty line, including 25.4% of those under age 18 and 40.8% of those age 65 or over.

== Education ==
The Town of Walnut is served by the North Tippah School District.

== Media ==
WLRC 850 on the AM dial is a daytime-only station serving Walnut and the surrounding area with a Gospel music format.

== Notable people ==
- Kermit Davis Sr. (1935–2026) – college basketball player and coach
