= Murder in Mississippi law =

In the law of the U.S. state of Mississippi, murder constitutes the intentional killing, under circumstances defined by law. The United States Centers for Disease Control and Prevention reported that in the year 2020, the state had the highest murder rate in the country, just ahead of Louisiana.

== Classifications ==
Murder in Mississippi encompasses the premeditated killing of a person or an unborn child, as well as killing "in the commission of an act eminently dangerous to others and evincing a depraved heart, regardless of human life".

A murder is elevated to the level of capital murder based on certain circumstances of the perpetrator, victim, location, or means by which it is committed, including:

1. It was committed by a person under sentence of imprisonment.
2. The defendant was previously convicted of another capital offense or of a felony involving the use or threat of violence to the person.
3. The defendant knowingly created a great risk of death to many persons.
4. It was committed while the defendant was engaged, or was an accomplice, in the commission of, or an attempt to commit, or flight after committing or attempting to commit, any robbery, rape, arson, burglary, kidnapping, aircraft piracy, sexual battery, unnatural intercourse with any child under the age of 12, or nonconsensual unnatural intercourse with mankind, or felonious abuse or battery of a child, or the unlawful use or detonation of a bomb or explosive device.
5. It was committed for the purpose of avoiding or preventing a lawful arrest or effecting an escape from custody.
6. It was committed for pecuniary gain.
7. It was committed to disrupt or hinder the lawful exercise of any governmental function or the enforcement of laws.
8. It was committed to influence the policy of a governmental entity by intimidation or coercion, or to affect the conduct of a governmental entity by mass destruction or assassination.
9. It was especially heinous, atrocious or cruel.
10. It was committed to intimidate or coerce a civilian population.

== Penalties ==
| Offense | Mandatory sentencing |
|---|---|
| Manslaughter | Up to 20 years in prison |
| Second degree murder | Life (eligible for conditional release at age 65 and having served at least 15 years) or 20 to 40 years |
| First degree murder if the defendant was a juvenile | On or after July 1, 2024: Life (eligible for conditional release at age 65) or 20 to 40 years Before July 1, 2024: Any legal punishment (other than death) as directed by the court |
| First degree murder | Life (eligible for conditional release at age 65 and having served at least 15 years) |
| Capital murder if the defendant was a juvenile | On or after July 1, 2024: Life without parole, life (eligible for conditional release at age 65 and having served at least 15 years), or 25 to 50 years Before July 1, 2024: Any legal punishment (other than death) as directed by the court |
| Capital murder | Death, life without parole, or life (eligible for conditional release at age 65 and having served at least 15 years) |

== See also ==
- Capital punishment in Mississippi
