= Tippah County, Mississippi =

County in Mississippi, United States

- County
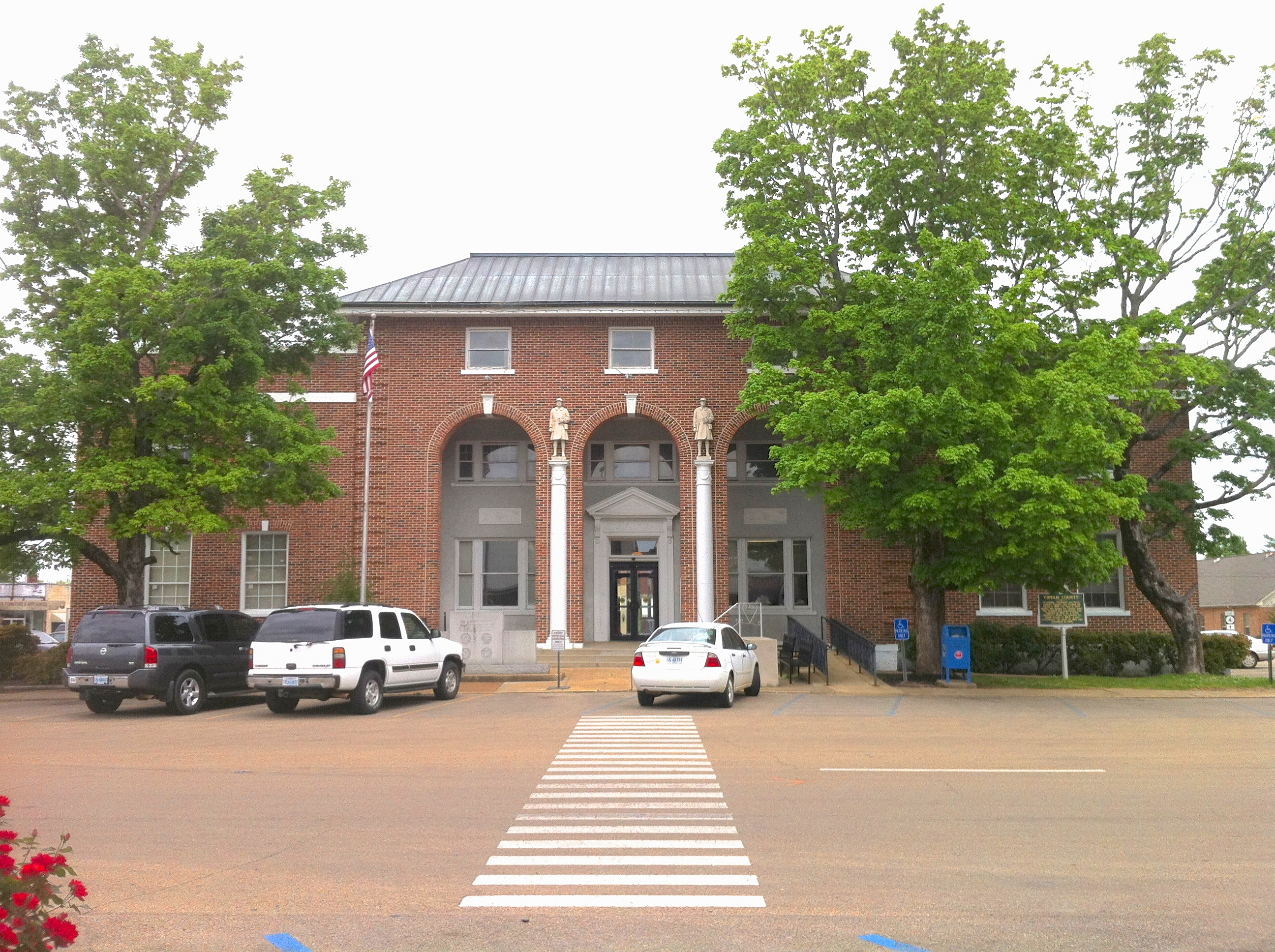
- The Tippah County Courthouse in Ripley

- Location within the U.S. state of Mississippi
- Coordinates: 34°46′N 88°55′W
- Country: United States
- State: Mississippi
- Founded: 1836
- Named for: Chickasaw language word meaning "Cut off"
- Seat: Ripley
- Largest city: Ripley

Area
  - Total: 460 sq mi (1,200 km^{2})
  - Land: 458 sq mi (1,190 km^{2})
  - Water: 2.1 sq mi (5.4 km^{2}) 0.5%

Population (2020)
  - Total: 21,815
  - Estimate (2025): 21,389 ▼
  - Density: 47.6/sq mi (18.4/km^{2})
- Time zone: UTC−6 (Central)
  - Summer (DST): UTC−5 (CDT)
- Congressional district: 1st
- Website: www.co.tippah.ms.us

Tippah County is a county located on the northern border of the U.S. state of Mississippi. As of the 2020 census, the population was 21,815. Its county seat is Ripley. The name "Tippah" is derived from a Chickasaw language word meaning "cut off." It was taken from the creek of the same name that flows across much of the original county from northeast to southwest before emptying into the Tallahatchie River. The creek probably was so named because it, and the ridges on either side, "cut off" the western part of the region from the eastern portion.

One of President Bill Clinton's great-grandfathers is buried here.

== Geography ==
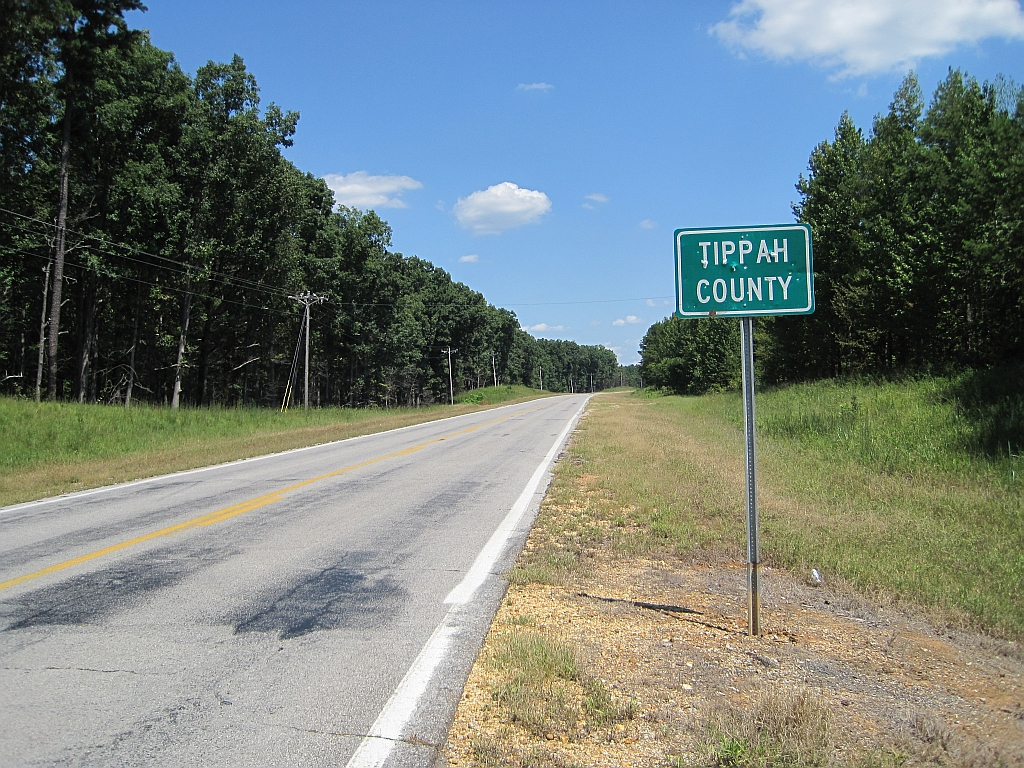

According to the U.S. Census Bureau, the county has a total area of 460 square miles (1,200 km^{2}), of which 458 square miles (1,190 km^{2}) is land and 2.1 square miles (5.4 km^{2}) (0.5%) is water.

=== Major highways ===
- U.S. Highway 72
- Mississippi Highway 2
- Mississippi Highway 4
- Mississippi Highway 15

=== Adjacent counties ===
- Hardeman County, Tennessee (north)
- Alcorn County (northeast)
- Prentiss County (southeast)
- Union County (south)
- Benton County (west)

=== National protected area ===
- Holly Springs National Forest (part)

== Demographics ==
Historical population
Census	Pop.	Note	%±
1840	9,444		—
1850	20,741		119.6%
1860	22,550		8.7%
1870	20,727		−8.1%
1880	12,867		−37.9%
1890	12,951		0.7%
1900	12,983		0.2%
1910	14,631		12.7%
1920	15,419		5.4%
1930	18,658		21.0%
1940	19,680		5.5%
1950	17,522		−11.0%
1960	15,093		−13.9%
1970	15,852		5.0%
1980	18,739		18.2%
1990	19,523		4.2%
2000	20,826		6.7%
2010	22,232		6.8%
2020	21,815		−1.9%
2025 (est.)	21,389	▼	−2.0%
U.S. Decennial Census; 1790-1960 1900-1990; 1990-2000 2010-2013

=== Racial and ethnic composition ===
Tippah County, Mississippi – Racial and ethnic composition Note: the US Census treats Hispanic/Latino as an ethnic category. This table excludes Latinos from the racial categories and assigns them to a separate category. Hispanics/Latinos may be of any race.
Race / Ethnicity (NH = Non-Hispanic)	Pop 1980	Pop 1990	Pop 2000	Pop 2010	Pop 2020	% 1980	% 1990	% 2000	% 2010	% 2020
White alone (NH)	15,642	16,206	16,890	17,404	16,609	83.47%	83.01%	81.10%	78.28%	76.14%
Black or African American alone (NH)	2,961	3,221	3,306	3,509	3,447	15.80%	16.50%	15.87%	15.78%	15.80%
Native American or Alaska Native alone (NH)	6	12	38	34	20	0.03%	0.06%	0.18%	0.15%	0.09%
Asian alone (NH)	12	17	21	34	24	0.06%	0.09%	0.10%	0.15%	0.11%
Native Hawaiian or Pacific Islander alone (NH)	x	x	3	1	0	x	x	0.01%	0.00%	0.00%
Other race alone (NH)	0	3	14	14	50	0.00%	0.02%	0.07%	0.06%	0.23%
Mixed race or Multiracial (NH)	x	x	120	251	547	x	x	0.58%	1.13%	2.51%
Hispanic or Latino (any race)	118	64	434	985	1,118	0.63%	0.33%	2.08%	4.43%	5.12%
Total	18,739	19,523	20,826	22,232	21,815	100.00%	100.00%	100.00%	100.00%	100.00%

=== 2020 census ===
As of the 2020 census, the county had a population of 21,815. The median age was 40.3 years. 23.3% of residents were under the age of 18 and 18.7% of residents were 65 years of age or older. For every 100 females there were 94.7 males, and for every 100 females age 18 and over there were 91.9 males age 18 and over.

<0.1% of residents lived in urban areas, while 100.0% lived in rural areas.

There were 8,761 households in the county, of which 30.3% had children under the age of 18 living in them. Of all households, 46.3% were married-couple households, 19.6% were households with a male householder and no spouse or partner present, and 29.4% were households with a female householder and no spouse or partner present. About 30.5% of all households were made up of individuals and 13.9% had someone living alone who was 65 years of age or older.

There were 9,877 housing units, of which 11.3% were vacant. Among occupied housing units, 72.3% were owner-occupied and 27.7% were renter-occupied. The homeowner vacancy rate was 0.9% and the rental vacancy rate was 9.4%.

=== 2000 census ===
At the 2000 census, there are 20,826 people, 8,108 households and 5,910 families residing in the county. The population density was 46 per square mile (18/km^{2}). There were 8,868 housing units at an average density of 19 per square mile (7.3/km^{2}). The racial makeup of the county was 81.85% White, 15.92% Black or African American, 0.20% Native American, 0.11% Asian, 0.01% Pacific Islander, 1.29% from other races, and 0.61% from two or more races. 2.08% of the population were Hispanic or Latino of any race.

As of 2000, there were 8,108 households, of which 33.70% had children under the age of 18 living with them, 57.20% were married couples living together, 11.80% had a female householder with no husband present, and 27.10% were non-families. 24.90% of all households were made up of individuals, and 11.40% had someone living alone who was 65 years of age or older. The average household size was 2.52 and the average family size was 3.00.

Age distribution was 25.00% under the age of 18, 10.10% from 18 to 24, 27.90% from 25 to 44, 22.50% from 45 to 64, and 14.50% who were 65 years of age or older. The median age was 36 years. For every 100 females there were 93.70 males. For every 100 females age 18 and over, there were 90.20 males.

The median household income was $29,300, and the median family income was $34,547. Males had a median income of $27,505 versus $20,446 for females. The per capita income for the county was $14,041 About 14.00% of families and 16.90% of the population were below the poverty line, including 19.00% of those under age 18 and 23.30% of those age 65 or over.

== Communities ==
=== City ===
- Ripley (county seat)

=== Towns ===
- Blue Mountain
- Dumas
- Falkner
- Walnut

=== Census-designated place ===
- Chalybeate

=== Unincorporated communities ===
- Brownfield
- Tiplersville
- Lake Mohawk
- Dry Creek
- Cotton Plant
- Camp Hill

== Media ==
- TippahNews.com

== Politics ==
Tippah County is a Republican stronghold, having moved away from the Democratic Party in the 1960s along with much of the rest of Mississippi (although southern favorite Jimmy Carter did carry the county in both 1976 and 1980). The Republican trend in the county has increased in recent presidential elections, with the 2024 election showing the strongest Republican performance since 1972.

United States presidential election results for Tippah County, Mississippi
Year	Republican		Democratic		Third party(ies)	
Year	No.	%	No.	%	No.	%
1912	34	2.89%	1,056	89.87%	85	7.23%
1916	82	5.00%	1,547	94.33%	11	0.67%
1920	237	19.52%	955	78.67%	22	1.81%
1924	96	6.19%	1,411	90.91%	45	2.90%
1928	298	16.98%	1,457	83.02%	0	0.00%
1932	52	2.56%	1,972	97.24%	4	0.20%
1936	19	1.16%	1,625	98.84%	0	0.00%
1940	63	2.73%	2,248	97.27%	0	0.00%
1944	126	4.73%	2,539	95.27%	0	0.00%
1948	66	3.07%	425	19.75%	1,661	77.18%
1952	511	15.08%	2,878	84.92%	0	0.00%
1956	287	9.71%	2,569	86.94%	99	3.35%
1960	486	16.80%	1,939	67.05%	467	16.15%
1964	2,482	71.82%	974	28.18%	0	0.00%
1968	589	10.02%	663	11.28%	4,627	78.70%
1972	3,937	85.87%	569	12.41%	79	1.72%
1976	1,887	30.08%	4,260	67.90%	127	2.02%
1980	3,338	44.97%	3,878	52.24%	207	2.79%
1984	4,706	64.46%	2,566	35.15%	29	0.40%
1988	4,593	60.41%	2,958	38.91%	52	0.68%
1992	4,444	50.85%	3,475	39.76%	820	9.38%
1996	3,249	46.80%	2,992	43.10%	701	10.10%
2000	5,381	64.04%	2,908	34.61%	114	1.36%
2004	6,174	66.57%	3,016	32.52%	85	0.92%
2008	6,937	71.33%	2,623	26.97%	165	1.70%
2012	6,717	73.30%	2,317	25.28%	130	1.42%
2016	7,240	78.40%	1,842	19.95%	153	1.66%
2020	8,054	79.73%	1,937	19.17%	111	1.10%
2024	7,984	83.24%	1,547	16.13%	60	0.63%

== Education ==
The county has two school districts: North Tippah School District and South Tippah School District.

Northeast Mississippi Community College is the community college for Tippah County.

== See also ==
- National Register of Historic Places listings in Tippah County, Mississippi
