= Capital punishment in Mississippi =

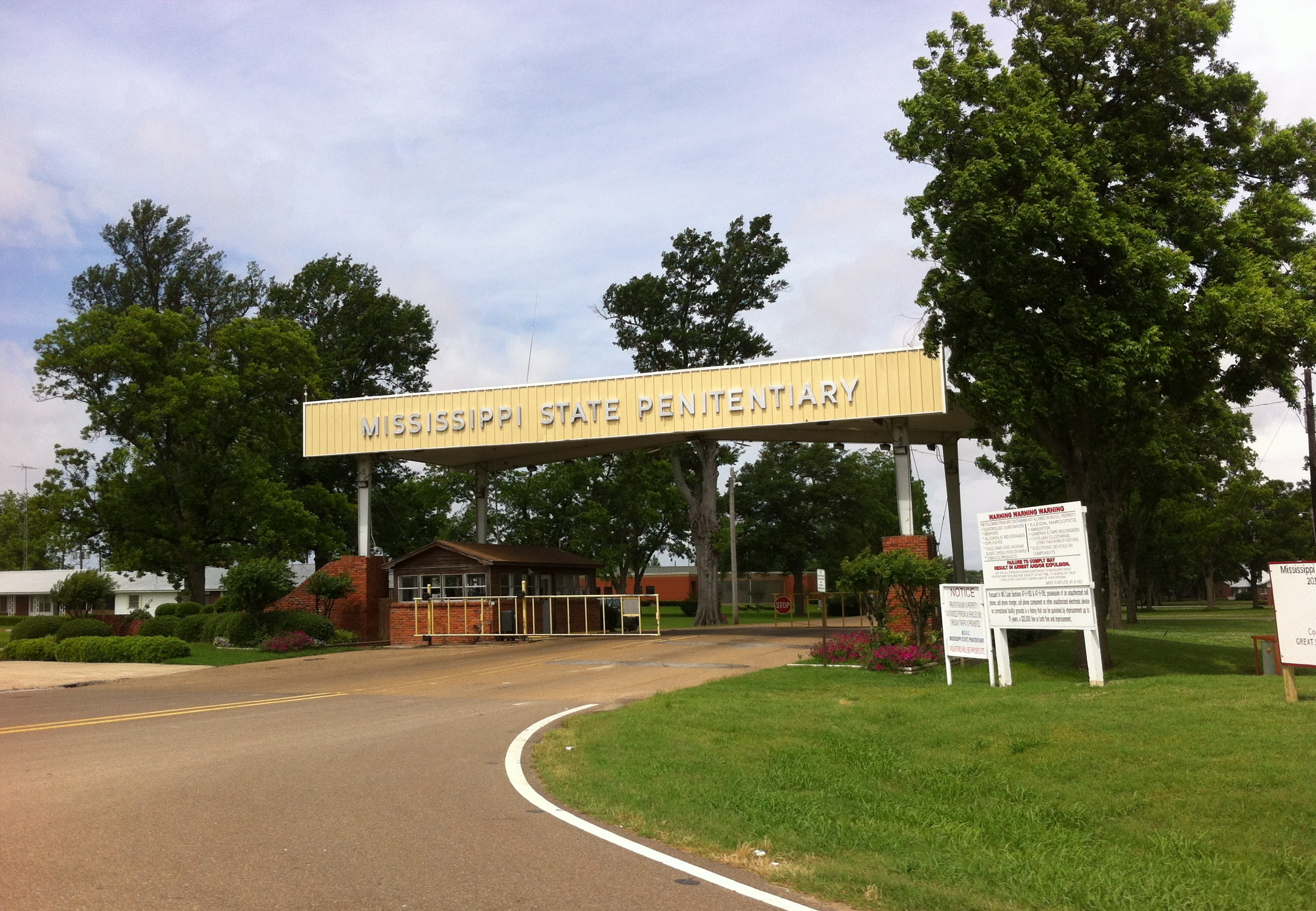
Mississippi State Penitentiary, the location of the death row for men and the execution chamber

Capital punishment is a legal penalty in the U.S. state of Mississippi.

== Legal process ==
When the prosecution seeks the death penalty, the sentence is decided by the jury and must be unanimous. If the jury recommends death, it is required to record what it considers the "aggravating circumstances" about the crime that led it to that decision.

In case of a hung jury during the penalty phase of the trial, the judge issues a life sentence, even if only one juror opposed death (there is no retrial).

The power of clemency belongs to the Governor of Mississippi.

== Capital crimes ==
The following crimes are punishable by death in Mississippi:

- Treason.
- Murder with one of the following aggravating factors:
1. It was committed by a person under sentence of imprisonment.
2. The defendant was previously convicted of another capital offense or of a felony involving the use or threat of violence to the person.
3. The defendant knowingly created a great risk of death to many persons.
4. It was committed while the defendant was engaged, or was an accomplice, in the commission of, or an attempt to commit, or flight after committing or attempting to commit, any robbery, rape, arson, burglary, kidnapping, aircraft piracy, sexual battery, unnatural intercourse with any child under the age of 12, or nonconsensual unnatural intercourse with mankind, or felonious abuse or battery of a child, or the unlawful use or detonation of a bomb or explosive device.
5. It was committed for the purpose of avoiding or preventing a lawful arrest or effecting an escape from custody.
6. It was committed for pecuniary gain.
7. It was committed to disrupt or hinder the lawful exercise of any governmental function or the enforcement of laws.
8. It was committed to influence the policy of a governmental entity by intimidation or coercion, or to affect the conduct of a governmental entity by mass destruction or assassination.
9. It was especially heinous, atrocious or cruel.
10. It was committed to intimidate or coerce a civilian population.

The laws on the books in Mississippi also provide the death penalty for aircraft hijacking under Title 97, Chapter 25, Section 55 of the Mississippi Code, but in 2008, the U.S. Supreme Court ruled in Kennedy v. Louisiana, that the death penalty is unconstitutional when applied to non-homicidal crimes against the person. However, the ruling meant that crimes "against the state" such as treason or terrorism would not likely be unconstitutional. Therefore, the offence of aircraft hijacking would likely be considered a crime against the state in Mississippi because it is widely considered to be an act of terrorism and the death penalty in this case may be constitutional.

== Death row and executions ==
Men on death row are held at Unit 29 in The Mississippi State Penitentiary, while women on death row are held at the Central Mississippi Correctional Facility (CMCF) in Rankin County.

Currently executions take place at the Mississippi Department of Corrections (MDOC) Mississippi State Penitentiary (MSP, also known as "Parchman") in Sunflower County. The condemned prisoner is moved into a holding cell adjacent to the execution room in Unit 17, the location of the execution chamber, in the MSP from their death row unit 48 hours prior to the execution. The state places MSP on emergency lockdown status 24 hours before the execution. At 12:00 PM, a media center at MSP opens. At 3:00 PM, the condemned's attorney of record and chaplain are permitted to visit the prisoner. At 4:00 PM, the prisoner receives their last meal and may shower at that time. At 4:30 PM, if the condemned desires, MDOC clergy may visit the prisoner. At 5:30, witnesses to the execution are transported to Unit 17. At 6:00 PM, officials move the condemned from the holding cell to the execution chamber. At the same time, the witnesses enter the designated observation areas and the execution by lethal injection is then carried out. At 7:00 PM, the state conducts a post-execution briefing with media witnesses. At 8:30 PM, the state closes its media center.

The method is selected by commissioner of corrections among lethal injection, nitrogen hypoxia, electrocution and firing squad, but lethal injection is the "preferred" method. The Department of Corrections currently has a lethal injection facility, as well as a (currently unused) gas chamber.

The execution chamber was built in 2002, adjacent to the gas chamber, which is no longer in use but has not been disassembled.

== Early history ==
The State of Mississippi used hanging as its method of execution for much of its history. From the earliest recorded execution in 1818 to 2004, records indicate that the state executed a total of 794 people. Of these, the great majority were black males, who account for 639 of recorded executions.

On January 3, 1907, Will Harvey, a black man, was executed for the murder of another black man named Peter Brauner, despite the fact that Governor James K. Vardaman had decided to commute his sentence to life imprisonment. Harvey was not wrongfully convicted. It was undisputed that he shot and killed an unarmed Brauner without provocation over an unclear dispute. Nevertheless, after reviewing the case, Governor Vardaman decided to commute Harvey's sentence to life imprisonment. Prison officials only learned about the commutation three minutes after Harvey had already been hanged.

Mississippi also nearly wrongfully executed Will Purvis in 1894. Purvis was a member of the White Caps, a white supremacist terrorist organization similar to the Ku Klux Klan. He had been convicted of the murder of a fellow White Cap, who was assassinated after reporting the flogging of his family's black farmhand. Purvis survived his execution when the noose loosened around his neck and the mob threatened the riot to when the sheriff tried to hang him again. Purvis's death sentence was commuted to life in prison in 1895. He was pardoned in 1898 after the victim's brother admitted that he was mistaken about the identification of his brother's killer. In 1917, former White Cap member Joe Beard made a deathbed confession to his involvement in Buckley's murder and identified the killer as Louis Thornhill, who had since died.

Around the time of the 1901 opening of the Mississippi State Penitentiary (MSP) in Parchman, Sunflower County residents objected to having executions performed at MSP because they feared that Sunflower County would be stigmatized as a "death county." Therefore, the State of Mississippi originally performed executions of condemned criminals in their counties of conviction. When, in 1940, Mississippi's state legislature decided to change the state's method of execution to electrocution, while continuing to conduct executions in the county of conviction, a portable electric chair was developed and fabricated for the state's use. On October 11, 1940, the state's first execution of a condemned prisoner by electrocution occurred; Willie Mae Bragg, a black man convicted of murdering his wife, was electrocuted in his county of conviction, Jefferson Davis County. Interestingly, on the same day, Mississippi also carried out their final hanging in a different county when Hilton Fortenberry, another murderer, was put to death in Sharkey County. The state moved the electric chair from county to county, using it to kill condemned prisoners in their counties of conviction. One such example was Houston Roberts, a white man convicted of poisoning his granddaughter in Jackson. Mississippi and Louisiana were the only U.S. states to use a portable electric chair.

Around the 1950s residents of Sunflower County were still opposed to the concept of housing the execution chamber at MSP. In September 1954, Governor Hugh L. White called for a special session of the Mississippi Legislature to discuss the application of the death penalty. During that year, a gas chamber serving as an execution chamber was installed at MSP. The gas chamber replaced the portable electric chair which, between 1940 and November 10, 1954, had been moved from county to county to execute condemned prisoners. The final high-profile execution in a portable electric chair was that of Luther Carlyle Wheeler, a white man convicted of murdering a Hattiesburg police officer. He was executed on February 5, 1954, in the Humphreys County courthouse, where, as was customary in Mississippi at the time, the executioner placed the chair in the same courtroom where the jury had convicted the condemned man. Wheeler's execution was attended by a crowd of approximately 300 people. The first person to die in the gas chamber was Gerald Albert Gallego, who was executed for murder on March 3, 1955.

A major shift occurred during 1972 when the Supreme Court Case Furman vs. Georgia concluded that capital punishment was unconstitutional because it violated the Eighth Amendment, effectively halting state death penalty laws across the nation. This led to death sentences being lessened to life in prison; however, in 1976, the Supreme Court overturned their ruling in Furman v. Georgia. Gregg v. Georgia revived the death penalty on the basis that some cases, like murder, warrant the use of capital punishment and do not violate the Eighth and Fourteenth Amendments, which was ensured through bifurcated trials.

== Since 1976 resumption of capital punishment nationwide ==
On July 1, 1984, the Legislature of Mississippi amended §§ 99-19-51 of the Mississippi Code; the new amendment stated that prisoners who committed capital crimes after July 1, 1984, would be executed by lethal injection. When the Central Mississippi Correctional Facility (CMCF) opened in January 1986, all women who were incarcerated at MSP were moved to CMCF. The $41 million Unit 32, the state's designated location for male death row inmates, opened in August 1990. Previously Unit 17 housed MSP's male death row. On March 18, 1998, the legislature made another amendment, removing the gas chamber as a method of execution. The lethal injection table was first used in 2002.

Since 1976, Mississippi has executed fewer prisoners than six other southern states despite comparable homicide rates. As of October 2025, 25 inmates were executed after 1976. One critic claims that this stems from the inability of poorer counties to afford legal fees for defendants accused of capital crimes. Because death penalty cases are subject to a high standard of review—and there is a constitutional requirement for effective assistance of counsel as a matter of due process of law and subsequent appellate review—this has led to a practical and constitutional impediment to its operation.

Since 1985, six prisoners on death row in Mississippi have been released after their charges were dismissed or they were acquitted of the charges on appeal.

Capital punishment has been challenged by death row inmates, such as Richard Gerald Jordan, who was the longest serving individual on the state's death row before his execution in 2025. In 2017, Jordan filed his appeal on the basis of concerns over the effectiveness of midazolam, a substance used to sedate individuals during lethal injection. Jordan's case argued that the potential for ineffective sedation would pose the threat of violating an individual's constitutional protection against cruel and unusual punishment. However, Jordan's petition was largely ignored.

Mississippi is also one of seven states that have 1 woman on death row, as of October, 2025. The one woman who has been on death row in Mississippi since 2006 is Lisa Jo Chamberlin, who was convicted along with her accomplice, Roger Gillett, for the murders of Vernon Hulett, Gillett's cousin, and Linda Heintzelman, Hulett's girlfriend. Chamberlin has since applied for appeals for post-conviction relief on the basis of having been under the control of Gillett, which the state opposed and has since dismissed. She has spoken with journalists about the unequal treatment she receives at Central Mississippi Correctional Facility, which consists of being locked in her cell or solitary confinement for days on end, or the deprivation of stimulating activities that men at MDOC have access to like TV, gaming systems, books, etc. However, after a change in her custody level she has gained some privileges like a tablet and the ability to access more resources in CMCF.

On July 1, 2022, a law was passed granting the state's Department of Corrections the ability to choose which method out of the allowed to carry out a death sentence (although MDOC currently still uses lethal injection to carry out executions). Prior to 2022, under a 2017 law, alternative methods were to be used (in the order of nitrogen hypoxia, electrocution, and firing squad) only if lethal injection were to be unavailable.

With effect from July 1, 2026, Mississippi allows the death penalty for child rape in cases where the victim was 12 years old or younger and suffered either injury or damage to their sexual organs, based on Senate Bill 2821 as proposed by lawmakers and passed by the Senate.

== See also ==
- List of people executed in Mississippi (pre-1972)
- List of people executed in Mississippi
- List of death row inmates in the United States § Mississippi
- Crime in Mississippi
- Law of Mississippi
