= Jimmy Lee Gray =

American murderer (1948–1983)

- Born: September 25, 1948; Whittier, California, U.S.
- Died: September 2, 1983 (aged 34); Mississippi State Penitentiary, Sunflower County, Mississippi, U.S.
- Cause of death: Executed (botched) by gas chamber
- Status: Executed
- Convictions: Arizona; Second degree murder Mississippi; Capital murder
- Penalty: Arizona; 20 years to life Mississippi; Death

Details
- Victims: Elda Louise Prince, 16; Deressa Jean Scales, 3
- Date: January 5, 1968; June 25, 1976
- States: Arizona and Mississippi

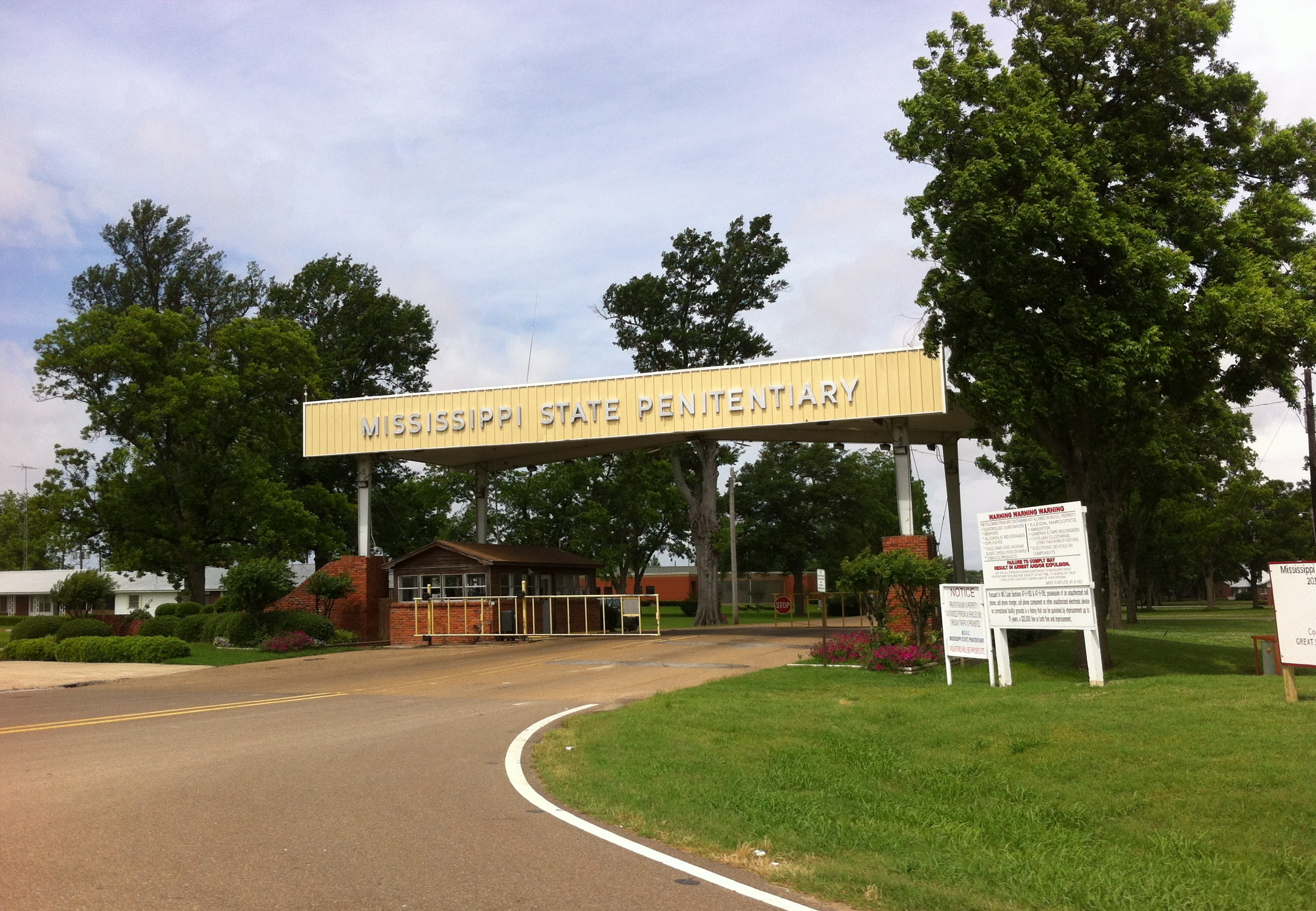
Mississippi State Penitentiary, where Gray was held on death row and executed

Jimmy Lee Gray (September 25, 1948 – September 2, 1983) was an American criminal convicted for the kidnapping, sexual assault and murder of three-year-old Deressa Jean Scales in 1976. At the time of this murder, he was free on parole after serving seven years of a 20-year-to-life sentence for the 1968 murder of his 16-year-old girlfriend, Elda Louise Prince, in Parker, Arizona. Scales's parents later sued the state of Arizona for releasing Gray.

== Early life ==
Jimmy Lee Gray was born on September 25, 1948 in Whittier, California to father Lee R. Gray, and mother Verna D. Gray (Hamilton). He had an older brother, Richard Gray, who was 2 years older than him.

Gray attended Sierra High School in Whittier, California. He graduated in 1966.

== Murders ==
In 1968, then 19-year-old Gray murdered his 16-year-old girlfriend, Elda Louise Prince, in Parker, Arizona. He strangled Elda, cut her throat, and dumped her body in a railroad culvert. After Elda was reported missing, Gray participated in the search efforts, which raised suspicions among law enforcement. Investigators observed that the pattern on Gray's shoes matched footprints found at the crime scene. Under questioning, Gray led deputies to a culvert near the Colorado River, where Elda's body was discovered. He received a penalty of 20 years to life. He was paroled in 1975 after serving only 7 years of his sentence. He had been in Mississippi for less than a year when the killing of 3-year-old Deressa Jean Scales occurred.

Gray lived in the same apartment as three-year-old Deressa Jean Scales. Deressa often went to visit Jimmy to play with his cats. On June 25, 1976, the day began normally for the Scales family. Scales had gone to work as usual and Mrs. Scales was about her household duties. About 4:30 in the afternoon, Mrs. Scales sent Deressa out to play, with instructions to return in ten minutes. During this timeframe, Jimmy convinced Deressa to get into his car, promising she could play with his cats. Gray stated that he initially had innocent intentions, but realized he would get in trouble for doing this. Following this, he took her to a wooded area near her house, raped and murdered her by pushing her face in mud. He then threw her body off a bridge. Internal examination revealed mud in the girl’s mouth, windpipe, and air sacs in the lungs. The lungs themselves contained air, which indicated that the child had not drowned.

When Deressa failed to return, Mrs. Scales went out looking for her; however, Deressa could not be found and Mrs. Scales called the police. Due to Deressa being known to frequently visit Gray's apartment to play with his cats, he was seen as a high priority suspect. The police found him at the Colonel Dixie Hamburger restaurant on Highway 90, where his "live-in" girlfriend worked. He was asked to accompany the officers to the complex for the purpose of pointing out to them where he had last seen Deressa. En route, it was decided that a statement should be taken from Gray and he was taken to the police station. While driving or arriving at the station, the police submitted information on Gray through the National Crime Information Center computer system and received a reply reflecting a "hit", indicating that Gray was wanted for some criminal offense. This information (which later turned out to be incorrect) was received at approximately 1:00 a.m. on the morning of June 26. A brief preliminary interrogation provided to be unfruitful. However, as the officers and Gray were ascending in the elevator, Gray spontaneously said, "If I take you to her, will you help me?" No offer of help was made to Gray but he offered to take the officers to where he had left Deressa. Gray and the officers entered an automobile to be directed by Gray to the place where he had left the child's body.

Gray was convicted and sentenced to death for the murder in December 1976. He was awarded a retrial by the Mississippi Supreme Court. In January 1978, his sentence was affirmed.

== Execution ==
In 1977, Gray's own mother, disgusted with her son, pleaded for the state of Mississippi to execute him. She wrote to the Mississippi Supreme Court, and governor Cliff Finch, asking for Mississippi to avoid showing any mercy for her son. She told a reporter, "I have a 2 1/2-year-old granddaughter. I kept thinking what that baby went through... It was a horrible thing."

Gray was executed on September 2, 1983, in Mississippi's gas chamber. This was the first use of the gas chamber since 1964. He became the first person to be executed in Mississippi since 1976, when capital punishment was reinstated.

His last meal consisted of burritos and enchiladas with refried beans and rice. He also ate strawberries, salad and milk. A pizza was a part of the meal too, brought by ministers with whom he ate his last meal. Prison officials said Gray ate "heartily", sharing the massive meal with the ministers, and when they were finished he was given a Protestant communion.

At the time of Gray's execution, the gas chamber used in Mississippi had a vertical steel pole directly behind the inmate's chair. While he was restrained in the chair, there was no headrest or strap used to restrain Gray's head. This gave his head a full range of motion.

Given the opportunity to make a final statement, he declined. At 12:10 a.m. the lever was pulled dropping cyanide pellets into sulfuric acid beneath his chair. The ensuing reaction produced a plume of hydrogen cyanide gas that rose upwards around Gray. As Gray began breathing in the toxic gas, he began making faces of discomfort, eventually turning to grotesque contortions of distress. By the 1 minute mark, his head slumped forward. Shortly after this, he suddenly threw his head back, bashing it into the metal bar behind the chair. He then began thrashing his head around, striking the iron bar repeatedly. Each time he did this, an audible clang would be heard in the witness room. He gasped, and convulsed strenuously. He stiffened. His head lurched back. His eyes widened, and he strained as much as the straps that held him to the chair would allow. He unquestionably appeared to be in pain. As the execution approached the 8-minute mark, Gray's eyes were rolled in the back of his head and his mouth was foaming. Officials decided to clear the observation room at 12:18 am after the gas had been released, because of Gray's injuries. Gray was pronounced dead a few minutes later.

"Within 30 seconds he lifted his head upwards again. He raised his entire body, arching, tugging at his straps. Saliva was oozing from his mouth. His eyes open, he turned his head to the right. He gazed through my window. His fingers were tightly gripping his thumbs. His chest was visibly heaving in sickening agony. Then he tilted his head higher, and rolled his eyes upward. Then he slumped forward. Still his heart was beating. It continued for another several minutes. He was pronounced dead, twelve minutes after the pellets were released, by the doctor who could hear his heart through the stethoscope" according to a testimony by Dr. Traystman.

The decision to clear the room was sharply criticized by Dennis Balske, Gray's attorney. "Jimmy Lee Gray died banging his head against a steel pole in the gas chamber while reporters counted his moans (eleven, not nearly enough according to the Associated Press)". Traystman further testified that the lethal-gas method is sufficiently painful that it is disfavored in the scientific community as a way of putting animals to sleep. "We would not use asphyxiation, by cyanide gas or by any other substance, in our laboratory to kill animals that have been used in experiments—nor would most medical research laboratories in this country use it."

Partly due to Gray's botched execution, Mississippi passed legislation making lethal injection the only method of execution for inmates sentenced after July 1, 1984, though three more inmates (Edward Earl Johnson, Connie Ray Evans and Leo Edwards Jr.) sentenced before this date were still executed by lethal gas. Mississippi's gas chamber was decommissioned in 1998.

== See also ==
- Capital punishment in Mississippi
- Capital punishment in the United States
- List of botched executions
- List of people executed in Mississippi
- List of people executed in the United States, 1976–1983

== Sources ==
- Death Penalty In Mississippi. Mississippi Department of Corrections. Retrieved on 2023-05-04.
- "Stay Of Execution Is Continued". The New York Times. July 7, 1983.
- Radelet, Michael L. Some Examples of Post-Furman Botched Executions. Death Penalty Information Center (2007-05-24). Retrieved on 2007-11-12.
- Gray v. Lucas, 463 U.S. 1237 (1983). Retrieved on 2007-11-12.
- Cabana, Donald. "Death at Midnight: The Confession of an Executioner. (Northeastern University Press, 1996), p. 7-8.

Executions carried out in Mississippi
Preceded by Tim Jackson May 1, 1964	Jimmy Lee Gray; September 2, 1983	Succeeded by Edward Earl Johnson May 20, 1987
Executions carried out in the United States
Preceded by John Louis Evans – Alabama April 22, 1983	Jimmy Lee Gray – Mississippi; September 2, 1983	Succeeded by Robert Austin Sullivan – Florida November 30, 1983
