= Martez =

Martez is a given name. Notable people with the name include:

- Martez Abram, American convicted murderer
- Martez Ivey, American professional football player
- Martez Wilson, American former professional football player
- Martez Harrison, American basketball player
