= Death at Midnight =

Non-fiction book

Death at Midnight: The Confession of an Executioner is a 1996 non-fiction book by Donald A. Cabana, published by Northeastern University Press. Cabana was the warden of the Mississippi State Penitentiary in Sunflower County, Mississippi. After his term, he spoke against the death penalty.

== Background ==
Cabana had begun his university studies, but he fought in the Vietnam War and returned to the United States in 1969. He attended Northeast University for a bachelor's of science in criminal justice. While attending university he interned, then worked at Massachusetts Correctional Institution at Bridgewater. Cabana began working in Parchman in 1972. He was supposed to work as a case manager and counselor for prisoners - an employee of Parchman had made a job offer to him - but instead was hired as a prison guard after he arrived at Mississippi with his family. At one point he was dismissed from his job at Parchman and went on to be a parole officer and then a head of a Florida correctional institution. He became the deputy warden of the Missouri State Penitentiary, where he helped administer capital punishment. He became warden of Parchman in 1984, and he executed Edward Earl Johnson and Connie Ray Evans. He was in the warden in the position until the 1980s. He became an instructor at Southern Mississippi University.

== Contents ==
Cabana describes his career trajectory into being an administrator in the prison system.

The book also contains information about the state of Parchman circa the 1970s. Francis A. Allen of the University of Florida described Parchman in that period and before as "deplorable". The State of Mississippi restored capital punishment in the 1980s. Cabana learned that as per procedure he was to participate in administering the gas chamber. According to Cabana, getting to know the condemned inmates made him oppose the death penalty, and he cited the case of Connie Ray Evans.

== Reception ==
Leigh B. Bienen of Northwestern University School of Law states that the book has "sentiment" but not "sentimentality".

Rod Morgan of the University of Bristol argued that the book is "less than compelling" in the way the narrative is described, and that he argued that the book is not likely to change how people argue over the death penalty in the United States and countries around the U.S.

Imogene L. Moyer of Indiana University of Pennsylvania described it as "a powerful biographical account".

Richard Tewksbury of the University of Louisville described the book as "powerful".
