= Interviews Before Execution =

- Starring: Ding Yu

Production
- Producers: Henan Legal Channel
- Running time: 60 minutes

Original release
- Network: Henan Legal Channel (China)
- Release: 18 November 2006 – March 2012

Interviews Before Execution (Chinese: 临刑会见) is a Chinese television talk show which was aired on the Henan Legal Channel in the country's Henan Province between 2006 and 2012. Presented by journalist Ding Yu the programme featured interviews with people convicted in cases of violent murder who were offered a chance to tell their story while under sentence of death. The interviews were conducted shortly before the offender was due to be executed – often within a few hours of the punishment being carried out. The show's purpose was to deter other potential criminals from committing similar offences by showing them the consequences of such actions.

== History ==
The first edition of Interviews Before Execution was aired on 18 November 2006, and the series was broadcast weekly on Saturday evenings thereafter. At the beginning of each week Ding Yu and her colleagues studied court records to find out who had been sentenced to death, and then selected potential interviewees. At the time the programme was on air, China carried the death penalty for as many as 55 separate offences, but the programme concentrated exclusively on murder convictions of a particularly violent nature, and where there was no doubt of the prisoner's guilt. During the time the series was on air Ding Yu interviewed 226 inmates, including a homosexual man convicted of the murder of his mother, a young man and his girlfriend who killed the girl's grandparents for financial gain, a woman convicted of the murder of her husband, and an 18-year-old who was one of the youngest people to be sentenced to death. Most were subsequently executed, but some had their death sentences reprieved; among them the woman convicted of killing her husband who successfully argued she had been a victim of domestic abuse.

Interviews Before Execution was aired solely in Henan Province, one of China's largest provinces with nearly 100 million residents, and regularly attracted an audience of 40 million viewers, making it one of Henan's top ten most popular television programmes. The series – originally Ding Yu's idea – made her a household name.

In 2012 Interviews Before Execution attracted international attention after the BBC broadcast a documentary about the programme for its This World strand. The film, Interviews Before Execution: A Chinese Talk Show, produced in association with LIC China, was aired on BBC Two in the United Kingdom on 12 March 2012. On 12 March the BBC reported that Chinese authorities had cancelled the programme as a result of the documentary and the international attention it had attracted. Links to the programme on the Henan Legal Channel's website were also removed. However, the channel later claimed that the programme was only temporarily off air. The documentary also aired in CI Network Southeast Asia.

== See also ==
- Fourteen Days in May
- In Prison My Whole Life
