= Fourteen Days in May =

- Directed by: Paul Hamann
- Starring: Edward Earl Johnson; Clive Stafford Smith
- Country of origin: United Kingdom
- Original language: English

Production
- Producer: Paul Hamann
- Cinematography: Pat O'Shea
- Editor: Andrew Willsmore
- Running time: 88 minutes

Original release
- Network: British Broadcasting Corporation
- Release: 1987

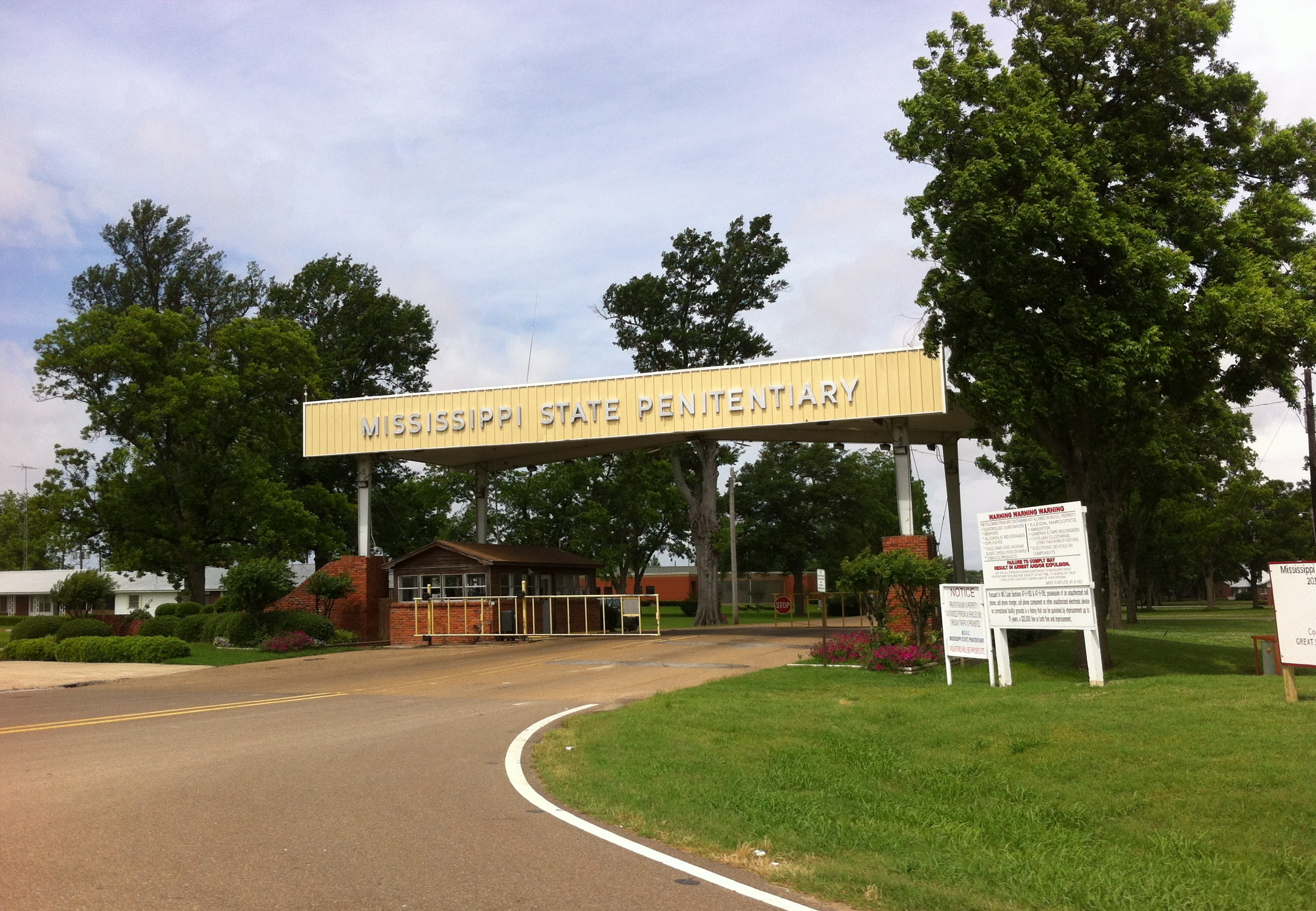
Mississippi State Penitentiary, the setting of the film

Fourteen Days in May is a documentary film directed by Paul Hamann and originally shown on television by the British Broadcasting Corporation (BBC) in 1987. The programme recounts the final days before the execution of Edward Earl Johnson, an American prisoner convicted of rape and murder and imprisoned in the Mississippi State Penitentiary. Johnson protested his innocence and claimed that his confession had been made under duress. He was executed in Mississippi's gas chamber on 20 May 1987.

The documentary crew, given access to the prison warden, guards and chaplain and to Johnson and his family, filmed the last days of Johnson's life in detail. The documentary argues against the death penalty and maintains that capital punishment is disproportionately applied to African-Americans convicted of crimes against whites. The programme features attorney Clive Stafford Smith, an advocate against capital punishment.

Fourteen Days in May won a British Film Institute Grierson Award and a top prize at the Festival dei Populi. It has been shown in many countries but has only appeared in an abbreviated form in the United States, on HBO. Hamann disowned this shortened version.

It was in direct response to this documentary that the Lifelines organisation was set up, to organise pen pals for death row prisoners.

The 1988 track '14 Days in May' by British rapper Overlord X contains samples from this documentary and can be found on the compilation album Street Sounds Hip Hop 20.

== See also ==
- Interviews Before Execution
- In Prison My Whole Life
