= 2019 Southaven Walmart shooting =

Shooting attack in Mississippi, U.S.

- Date: July 30, 2019
- Location: Southaven, Mississippi, U.S.
- Deaths: 2
- Injuries: 2 (including the perpetrator)
- Convicted: Martez Terrell Abram
- Verdict: Guilty
- Convictions: Capital murder (x2); Attempted murder (x1)
- Sentence: Death

On July 30, 2019, in Southaven, Mississippi, 39-year-old Martez Terrell Abram, a Walmart employee who was suspended from his job, fatally shot two of his co-workers, Anthony Brown and Brandon Gales, and wounded a police officer in a subsequent gunfight at the Walmart before he was arrested. Abram was said to be angered over his suspension for showing a knife to a fellow Walmart employee, which reportedly drove him to commit the shootings. Abram was found guilty of two counts of capital murder and one count of attempted murder, and sentenced to death in December 2022.

== Shooting ==
The incident occurred directly outside a Walmart store in Southaven, Mississippi. Two of the store's employees were killed by the shooter. Two were injured during the shooting, including the shooter and a police officer responding to the scene.

Prior to the shooting, 39-year-old Martez Terrell Abram had worked as an employee of the store for about 20 years. Three days before the shooting, according to sources, Abram allegedly confronted a co-worker and also showed a knife to the co-worker, and as a result, Abram was summoned to the manager's office and he thus received a suspension from his job. A police report was also lodged in this case.

Abram was outraged and disgruntled by the suspension, and it drove him into committing the shooting. On July 30, 2019, Abram barged into the store with two handguns (a .45-caliber Glock 21 and a 9mm SIG Sauer P320 w/ an extended magazine) and drew a firearm, shooting and killing two of his colleagues and the store's managers, 38-year-old Brandon Gales and 40-year-old Anthony Brown. Apart from the killings, Abram also started a fire in the store with a gallon jug of gasoline, where he tossed the Glock into the fire, resulting it being partially melted. According to the DeSoto County Coroner Joshua Pounders in his preliminary findings, both Brown and Gales died from gunshot wounds.

After killing two coworkers, Abram engaged in a subsequent gunfight with police officers responding to the scene. One of the police officers was wounded but his injury was not fatal due to the bullet hitting his bulletproof vest. On the other hand, Abram sustained two gunshot wounds and was, in the end, subdued by the police at the scene. The injured officer was rushed to the DeSoto Baptist Hospital while Abram was taken to the Regional One Medical Center, where they received medical treatment. The officer was discharged on August 1, 2019, while Abram remained hospitalized.

At the time of the shooting, Gales was a father to four children and he also worked in the store for 16 years before his recent promotion to department manager shortly before the shooting. Brown himself was a store manager and father of two children from Caledonia, Mississippi. The funeral wake of Brown took place from August 8 to August 9, 2019, while the memorial service of Gales took place on August 10, 2019.

== Extradition and charges ==
After the shooting, Abram was hospitalized in Shelby County, Tennessee for his injuries, and his condition was said to have stabilized two days after the shooting, allowing the police to question him while he was recuperating from his wounds. Aside from this, Abram was charged by the Mississippi authorities for murdering his two co-workers. Prior to the shooting, Abram did not have any prior criminal record.

After his recovery, the Southaven Police Department sought the governor's warrant to send Abrams back to Mississippi to face charges and stand trial for the Southaven Walmart shooting. Abram had expressed through his lawyer that he would be fighting against the extradition order.

In early September 2019, Mississippi governor Phil Bryant signed an extradition order and asked the Tennessee governor Bill Lee to approve the extradition of Abram to put him on trial in Mississippi for the Southaven Walmart shooting.

On September 13, 2019, during an extradition hearing in court, Abram decided to not challenge his extradition and agreed to return to Mississippi to face trial for the murders of Brandon Gales and Anthony Brown.

== Trial of Martez Abram ==
2023 Mugshot of Martez Abram

On November 28, 2022, the trial of Martez Abram began before a DeSoto County jury.

Several witnesses were called to testify on the shooting, with the prosecution presenting evidence on how Abram planned the shooting and attacked the victims. In his defense, Abram testified that he had acquired firearms due to safety concerns, citing previous problems at work and a car break-in. He stated, "I never had a gun before, but it had gotten to a point where I was scared that I was going to get hurt."

On December 1, 2022, the jury found Abram guilty of two counts of capital murder and one count of attempted murder. Under Mississippi state law, the offence of capital murder carries the death penalty.

On December 2, 2022, the jury unanimously recommended the death penalty for Abram. On top of the two death sentences for capital murder, Abram was also sentenced to life imprisonment on the jury's decision for the attempted murder charge.

In response to her stepson's death sentence, Abram's stepmother stated that no matter the enormity of Abram's crimes, she still regarded Abram as a son and she acknowledged the wrongfulness of Abram's actions, but Abram's stepmother found it to be unjust for her stepson to face capital punishment, considering that, in her words, there were many mass killers or child killers whose crimes were more heinous but they were not sentenced to death.

== Current status ==
Martez Abram is currently incarcerated on death row at the Mississippi State Penitentiary. A November 2023 report revealed that Abram was one of 37 condemned inmates sent to Mississippi's death row.

On June 11, 2025, the Mississippi Supreme Court started to hear the appeal of Abram.

On August 7, 2025, the Mississippi Supreme Court dismissed Abram's appeal.

== Reactions ==
In response to the shooting, Walmart President and CEO Greg Foran expressed that the company was heartbroken with the loss of two most valued members of the Walmart family, and expressed condolences to the victims' families.

Mayor Darren Musselwhite described the shooting as a "sign of the times" that invoked a lot of sadness in the city, and he revealed that he personally knew the store manager, which made it tough on him.

The community in Southaven was greatly shocked by the shooting, especially since all the residents knew the two murder victims. On August 2, 2019, hundreds of people in the community conducted a vigil on that night in remembrance of the deceased Walmart employees. Families and friends of both Brandon Gales and Anthony Brown gathered outside the store and comforted each other over the tragedy on the same date of the shooting.

The Walmart store, where the shooting took place, was closed for cleanup, due to the damage caused by the shooting and fire, and Walmart reopened portions of the store nine days later.

== See also ==
- Capital punishment in Mississippi
- List of death row inmates in the United States § Mississippi
