= Edward Earl Johnson =

American man executed in 1987

- Born: June 22, 1960; Jackson, Mississippi, U.S.
- Died: May 20, 1987 (aged 26); Mississippi State Penitentiary, Mississippi, U.S.
- Status: Executed by gas chamber
- Motive: To avoid arrest
- Conviction: Capital murder
- Penalty: Death

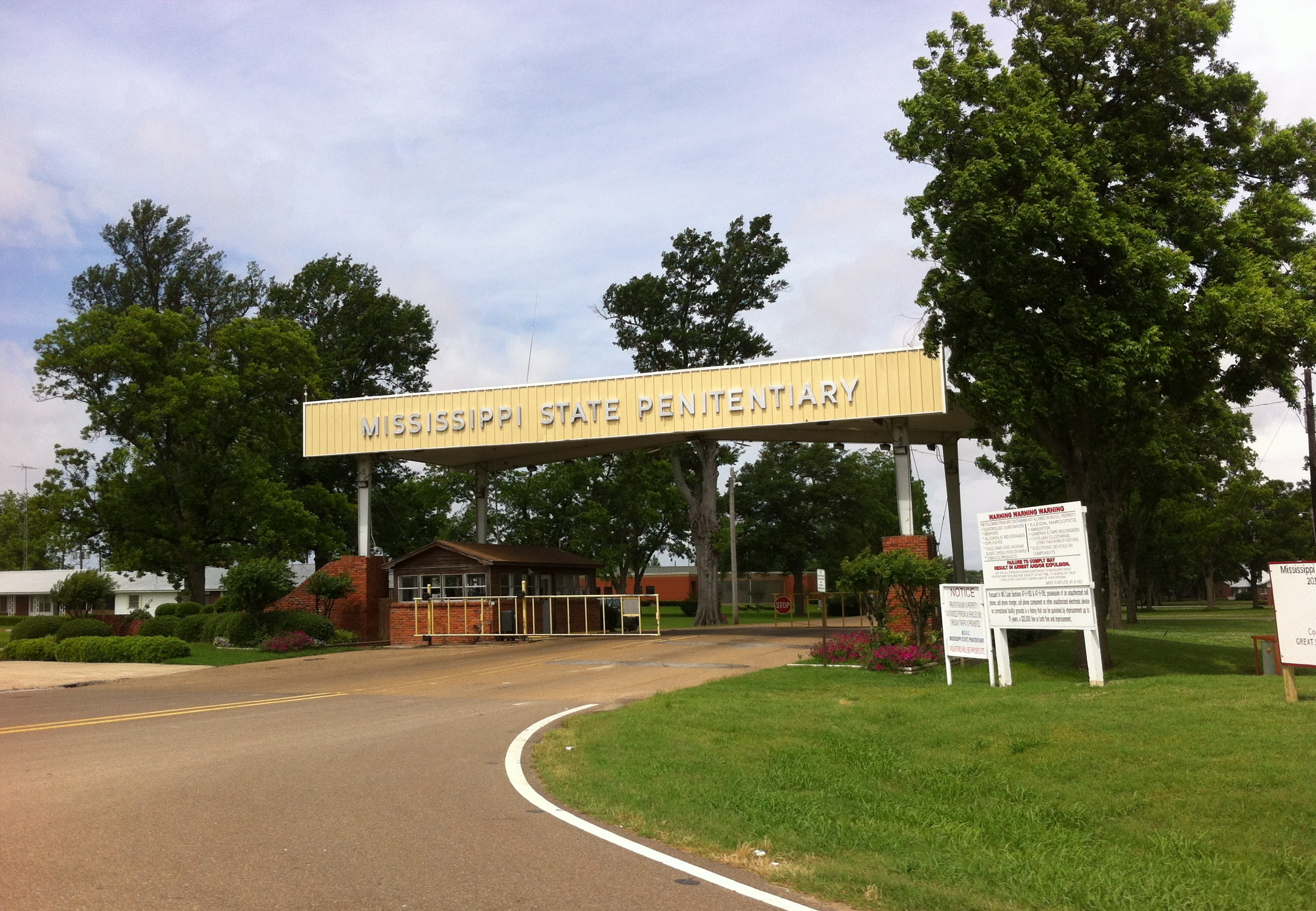
Mississippi State Penitentiary, where Johnson was held on death row and executed

Edward Earl Johnson (June 22, 1960 – May 20, 1987) was a man convicted in 1979 at the age of 19 and subsequently executed by the U.S. state of Mississippi for the murder of a policeman, J.T. Trest, and the attempted rape of a 69-year-old woman, Sally Franklin. During his eight years on death row, he publicly pleaded his innocence. Johnson was executed by gas chamber.

== Life ==
Johnson was born on June 22, 1960, at the University of Mississippi Medical Center in Jackson, Mississippi. He was born six weeks premature and spent the first month of his life in an incubator at the hospital. He later lived in Walnut Grove, Carthage, Mississippi.

Johnson was diagnosed as an alcoholic who suffered from alcoholic blackouts. He was later also diagnosed with antisocial personality disorder.

According to Johnson's clemency petition, he had initially wanted to become a basketball star, but later decided that he wanted to become a police officer. After leaving school, he took an aptitude exam for law enforcement.

== Crime ==
In the early morning hours of June 2, 1979, 69-year-old Sally Franklin was assaulted in her own home after her attacker gained access via a window. Franklin later identified her attacker at trial as Edward Earl Johnson. Shortly after, a neighbor found the body of Town Marshall J.T. Trest on the ground near his patrol car, which was parked near Franklin's home. He had been shot three times and killed. Johnson was arrested that afternoon and later released. Suspicion against Johnson grew when it was discovered that he had been seen in possession of a .25-caliber pistol a week earlier. He also owned the same type of car that was seen driving away from the crime scene. Another witness identified the suspect as a black male.

Johnson was arrested again the next day and made two confessions: a signed confession and a videotaped confession. The confession allowed the police to find Marshall Trest's revolver, which had gone missing after the murder. Johnson also reportedly confessed to a fellow inmate in the county jail named Sammy Jamison. Jamison would testify against Johnson at his trial.

Although Johnson maintained his innocence, he claimed that he had initially wanted to plead guilty to the murder. He and his trial attorneys claimed that the prosecution had offered a chance for Johnson to plead guilty in exchange for a life sentence. Johnson's trial attorneys said he rejected the offer after they erroneously informed him that he would not be eligible for parole. Johnson claimed he would have pleaded guilty had the deal carried a chance for parole. A federal court later found no evidence that Johnson was ever offered a plea deal. In his clemency petition, Johnson again claimed that he wanted to plead guilty to the murder.

== Execution ==
In spite of British lawyer Clive Stafford Smith's attempts for a reprieve, Johnson was executed. The documentary team was given access to him until minutes before the execution was carried out. A follow-up documentary by Stafford Smith claimed to prove conclusively that Johnson was innocent and had been framed by the police.

Johnson was pronounced dead at 12:06 a.m. on May 20, 1987, after being put to death in the gas chamber of what was then called Parchman Prison Farm. The prison warden, Don Cabana, recalled that out of all the condemned prisoners he'd encountered, Johnson was the only one who maintained his innocence to the end. He said every other prisoner gave some indication that something bad had happened and that he was there and part of it. Shortly before his execution, Johnson told Cabana that he was innocent. However, he also said he "regretted the whole situation," had no ill will for anyone, and was relieved that the legal process was coming to a close.

Johnson's final statement in the gas chamber echoed his wait for a stay of execution: "Well, I guess no one is going to call. OK, let's get this over with." It was the second execution by the state of Mississippi since the Gregg v. Georgia decision, the first being that of Jimmy Lee Gray, and the 72nd overall in the United States.

== Documentary ==
Johnson's case came to foreign attention when he was featured in the BBC documentary Fourteen Days in May. Broadcast in 1987, the documentary showed the last two weeks of Johnson's life. It starts on May 6, the day that Johnson learns the date of his execution. During interviews, Johnson said he confessed to the murder, but claimed he was forced by police in a deserted wood while they were threatening to shoot him.

== See also ==
- Capital punishment in Mississippi
- Capital punishment in the United States
- List of people executed in Mississippi
- List of people executed in the United States in 1987

Executions carried out in Mississippi
Preceded by Jimmy Lee Gray September 2, 1983	Edward Earl Johnson; May 20, 1987	Succeeded by Connie Ray Evans July 8, 1987
Executions carried out in the United States
Preceded by Joseph Mulligan – Georgia May 15, 1987	Edward Earl Johnson – Mississippi; May 20, 1987	Succeeded by Richard Tucker Jr. – Georgia May 22, 1987
