= Mary Rogers (murderer) =

American convicted murderer (1883–1905)

- Born: March 9, 1883; Hoosick, New York
- Died: December 8, 1905 (aged 22); Vermont State Prison, Windsor, Vermont
- Cause of death: Execution by hanging
- Resting place: St. Mary's Cemetery, Hoosick Falls, New York
- Occupation: Housewife
- Spouse: Marcus Rogers (m. 1898-1902, his death)
- Children: 1
- Parent(s): Charles Bennett; Johanna Bennett
- Conviction: First degree murder
- Penalty: Death

Mary Mabel Bennett Rogers (March 9, 1883 – December 8, 1905) was the last woman legally executed by Vermont. Rogers was hanged for the 1902 murder of her husband, Marcus Rogers.

== Early life ==
Mary Mabel Bennett was born to Charles and Johanna Bennett. Her father was reportedly a mentally ill alcoholic who was unable to hold down a job. As a result, he was abusive and tried to kill her a number of times.

== Marriage ==
At age 15, Mary Bennett married Marcus Rogers. She was noted for being immature and restless, and often stayed away from home when she was upset with her husband.

Rogers gave birth to a daughter in 1901. When the child was six months old, Rogers ran into a neighbor's home crying that she had dropped the baby, who later died of a fractured skull. Her husband's family, however, believed she had intentionally killed the child. These suspicions were heightened after Marcus Rogers became violently ill after drinking tea that his wife had prepared for him. Mary Rogers moved out of the house shortly after this incident, but her husband hoped they could reconcile.

== The crime ==
Marcus Rogers found work as a laborer in Hoosick Falls, New York, while Mary lived in Bennington, Vermont. Although Marcus pleaded with his wife to join him in Hoosick Falls, she refused. Mary Rogers struck up relationships with a laborer, Morris Knapp, and two brothers living in the same residence house as Knapp, Leon and Levi Perham. Rogers first approached Levi Perham with an offer of $500 if he would kill her husband. Levi initially agreed to help her, but he was intoxicated at the time and later backed out; he did not tell the police because he felt it was just idle talk.

Rogers then proposed the idea of murdering her husband to Leon Perham while they lay in bed in early August 1902; Leon agreed to help her kill her husband, even though Rogers made it clear that her reason for disposing of her husband was to leave her free to marry Knapp. Rogers arranged to meet her husband in a Bennington picnic grove on the evening of August 12. Leon Perham was with Mary when Marcus arrived, but apparently Marcus did not question Leon's presence. That evening, Mary pretended to be happy to have seen her husband and spoke with him of reconciliation.

At some point during the picnic, Mary offered to show her husband a rope trick she had learned from a friend. Mary tied Perham's hands several times, and each time Perham easily broke free of the restraint, with Mary pretending to be disappointed when he did so. Mary then challenged her husband to try the trick. She tied his wrists a few times, and he also easily broke free. Then Mary "convinced" Perham to try the trick on her husband. When Perham bound Marcus's wrists behind his back, Rogers could not break free. Mary took a vial of chloroform from her purse and forced her husband to breathe it in for about 20 minutes, until he stopped struggling. Mary went through Marcus's pockets and removed his life insurance payment book. Mary and Perham then rolled the body into the nearby river and Marcus Rogers drowned. Mary tacked Marcus's hat to a tree with a forged suicide note.

== Investigation and trial ==
The investigation began after the body was discovered; Perham made a full confession. At Rogers's trial in 1904, Perham was the state's key witness against her. Due to his testimony and his youth, Perham avoided the death penalty and was sentenced to life imprisonment. Rogers was found guilty of first-degree murder and sentenced to death by hanging.

== Commutation efforts ==
Following Rogers's conviction, there was a concerted effort to have her death sentence commuted. State Representative Frank C. Archibald of Manchester, who was also one of Rogers' attorneys, introduced a bill in the Vermont House of Representatives that would have commuted Rogers' sentence to life imprisonment. The bill was referred to the judiciary committee on October 12, 1904. On December 6, the committee reported in favor of its passage. On December 7, a vote on the bill in the House of Representatives was defeated by a vote of 139 to 91.

On December 9, Representative Archibald proposed a joint resolution of the Vermont House and Senate to investigate Rogers's physical and mental condition at the time of the commission of the crime and at the present time, and to prepare a report as to her condition for the governor. The resolution stated that if it should appear that Rogers either at the time she committed the crime or at present was mentally or physically unsound, that a reprieve should be requested and her execution delayed until after the 1906 Vermont Legislative Session. The House adopted this resolution but the Senate did not.

On May 30, 1905, Governor Charles J. Bell granted a reprieve to Rogers after the Vermont Supreme Court denied Rogers's appeal by a 5–2 vote; the reprieve was intended to allow the appeal to be heard by the United States Supreme Court. The U.S. Supreme Court heard the case on November 6 and held on November 27 that the Court could not find that Rogers had sustained any violation of her Federal Constitutional rights by the proceedings of the executive or judicial departments of the State of Vermont.

== Investigation into prison behavior ==
In 1904, the Vermont Commission to Investigate State Institutions began investigating charges of sexual misconduct at the Vermont State Prison, where Rogers was being held. A large portion of the commission's investigation focused on allegations of inappropriate sexual relations between Rogers and two other prisoners. Evidence of issues at the prison included the fact that a child was born to Rogers after she had been incarcerated for over a year.

== Execution ==
After the U.S. Supreme Court decision, Bell signed Rogers' execution warrant and the execution was scheduled for December 8, 1905. Rogers inquired on December 7 whether the gallows were being erected, despite efforts having been made to muffle the construction noise. During the ten days between the signing of the warrant and her execution, Rogers ate and slept well, but she declined breakfast on the morning of her execution.

Governor Bell granted leave to hear an appeal from Rogers's counsel at 8 a.m. on her scheduled execution day; however, he found no reason to commute her sentence. With no new evidence, he declined to stay the execution and Rogers was hanged at the Vermont State Prison later that day. She was pronounced dead at 1:17pm.

A scandal later ensued because of the circumstances of Rogers' death. The executioner reportedly used a rope that stretched when Rogers was dropped from the gallows, causing her to strangle as her feet scraped the floor. After several minutes, sheriff's deputies pulled on the end of the rope until Rogers was suspended, then held it in place until she finally died. However, the source of this account was William Hoster, who was known for yellow journalism, and the details of the execution widely varied.

Rogers is buried at St. Mary's Cemetery in Hoosick Falls, New York. Advocates for clemency later attempted to have a large monument to her memory placed at the cemetery. The Augustinian fathers who managed the site refused to allow it, citing a family request that no memorial mark Rogers' grave.

American Mutoscope produced a reenactment of Rogers' execution in 1905, released as a trilogy of films titled Reading the Death Sentence, An Execution by Hanging, and Reprieve from the Scaffold. Reprieve from the Scaffold depicts a fictional ending in which Rogers is not executed.

== See also ==
- Capital punishment in Vermont
- List of people executed in Vermont
- Emeline Meaker

== Additional reading ==
- John Stark Bellamy (2007). Vintage Vermont Villainies: True Tales of Murder & Mystery from the 19th and 20th Centuries (Woodstock, Vermont: Countryman) ISBN 978-0-88150-749-2
