= List of people executed in the United States in 1956 =

Sixty-five people, all male, were executed in the United States in 1956, forty-six by electrocution, sixteen by gas chamber, two by firing squad, and one by hanging.

In 2026, the Dallas County Commissioners Court voted unanimously to symbolically exonerate Tommy Lee Walker.

== List of people executed in the United States in 1956 ==
No.	Date of execution	Name	Age of person			Gender	Ethnicity	State	Method	Ref.
No.	Date of execution	Name	At execution	At offense	Age difference	Gender	Ethnicity	State	Method	Ref.
1	January 3, 1956	Robert Buchanan	35	34	1	Male	Black	Mississippi	Gas chamber	
2	January 3, 1956	Samuel Wright	20	19	1	Male	Black	South Carolina	Electrocution	
3	January 4, 1956	Carrol Dayton Farrar	36	34	2	Male	White	Texas	Electrocution	
4	January 12, 1956	William Snyder Byers	19	17	2	Male	White	New York	Electrocution	
5	January 18, 1956	Hurbie Franklin Fairris Jr.	22	20	2	Male	White	Oklahoma	Electrocution	
6	January 19, 1956	Norman Roye	20	18	2	Male	Black	New York	Electrocution	
7	January 20, 1956	Henry Lee Boone	33	32	1	Male	Black	South Carolina	Electrocution	
8	January 24, 1956	Johnnie Elwood Gordon	25	23	2	Male	Black	Texas	Electrocution	
9	January 26, 1956	John Francis Roche	28	26	2	Male	White	New York	Electrocution	
10	January 27, 1956	Walter Philpott	39	38	1	Male	Black	Georgia	Electrocution	
11	January 27, 1956	Edgar Keeler	38	37	1	Male	Black	Mississippi	Gas chamber	
12	February 17, 1956	O.C. McNair	24	22	2	Male	Black	Mississippi	Gas chamber	
13	February 20, 1956	George Anderson	30	27	3	Male	Black	Florida	Electrocution	
14	February 20, 1956	Percy Ambrister Jr.	29	26	3	Male	Black	Florida	Electrocution	
15	February 20, 1956	Herman Barwicks	28	26	2	Male	Black	Florida	Electrocution	
16	February 24, 1956	Arthur Ross Brown	30	29	1	Male	White	Federal government	Gas chamber	
17	February 24, 1956	James Larry Upton	22	20	2	Male	White	New Mexico	Electrocution	
18	March 6, 1956	Smith Edward Jordan	27	24	3	Male	Black	California	Gas chamber	
19	March 6, 1956	Robert Otis Pierce	27	24	3	Male	Black	California	Gas chamber	
20	March 15, 1956	Bernard A. Schreiber	19	17	2	Male	White	Ohio	Electrocution	
21	March 30, 1956	Aubrey Williams	29	25	4	Male	Black	Georgia	Electrocution	
22	April 5, 1956	James Russell	32	Unknown	Unknown	Male	Black	Mississippi	Gas chamber	
23	April 6, 1956	Walter Palmer	30	28	2	Male	Black	Louisiana	Electrocution	
24	April 13, 1956	Michael Timothy Cavanaugh	32	29	3	Male	White	California	Gas chamber	
25	April 13, 1956	Willie Grady Cochran	37	36	1	Male	White	Georgia	Electrocution	
26	April 28, 1956	Charlie Copeland Jr.	24	21	3	Male	Black	Florida	Electrocution	
27	May 11, 1956	Verne Alfred Braasch	27	21	6	Male	White	Utah	Firing squad	
28	May 11, 1956	Melvin LeRoy Sullivan	25	19	6	Male	White	Utah	Firing squad	
29	May 12, 1956	Tommy Lee Walker	21	18	3	Male	Black	Texas	Electrocution	
30	May 14, 1956	William Durant Cole	30	28	2	Male	Black	Pennsylvania	Electrocution	
31	June 4, 1956	Harry Earl Gossard	41	39	2	Male	White	Pennsylvania	Electrocution	
32	June 8, 1956	James Lee Turner	27	26	1	Male	Black	Georgia	Electrocution	
33	June 8, 1956	Marion Andrew Washington	29	28	1	Male	Black	Texas	Electrocution	
34	June 15, 1956	Eugene Augustine Morlock	25	24	1	Male	Native American	California	Gas chamber	
35	June 22, 1956	Dewey Townsel	26	25	1	Male	Black	Mississippi	Gas chamber	
36	June 28, 1956	Ernest Lee Edwards	22	20	2	Male	White	New York	Electrocution	
37	June 29, 1956	Frederick Mosley	25	23	2	Male	Black	Georgia	Electrocution	
38	July 13, 1956	Henry Thomas	32	26	6	Male	Black	California	Gas chamber	
39	July 13, 1956	Willie D. Jones	31	30	1	Male	Black	Mississippi	Gas chamber	
40	July 13, 1956	Robert S. Conner	30	28	2	Male	Black	North Carolina	Gas chamber	
41	July 13, 1956	Walter T. Wilson	30	28	2	Male	Black	Ohio	Electrocution	
42	July 27, 1956	Raymond Fuller Sr.	31	27	4	Male	Black	South Carolina	Electrocution	
43	August 20, 1956	Edgar Joseph LaVoie	56	54	2	Male	White	Florida	Electrocution	
44	August 21, 1956	John Henry Tune	26	22	4	Male	Black	New Jersey	Electrocution	
45	August 23, 1956	Frank J. Newman	51	49	2	Male	White	New York	Electrocution	
46	August 23, 1956	Flaudell Fite	27	26	1	Male	Black	Texas	Electrocution	
47	August 30, 1956	Joseph E. Reade Jr.	27	26	1	Male	White	New York	Electrocution	
48	August 30, 1956	Timothy Pierce	23	22	1	Male	Black	Texas	Electrocution	
49	August 31, 1956	Harold Byrd	24	23	1	Male	Black	South Carolina	Electrocution	
50	September 7, 1956	Besalirez Martinez	46	44	2	Male	Hispanic	Colorado	Gas chamber	
51	September 7, 1956	Robert Lee Hopkins	28	28	0	Male	White	West Virginia	Electrocution	
52	September 20, 1956	Joseph Allen	59	54	5	Male	Black	Ohio	Electrocution	
53	September 21, 1956	Leo Scarber	60	59	1	Male	Black	Arkansas	Electrocution	
54	September 21, 1956	Paul Cooper	48	47	1	Male	Black	Georgia	Electrocution	
55	September 28, 1956	Melvin Jackson	20	17	3	Male	Black	Alabama	Electrocution	
56	October 1, 1956	Robert Lee Colson	25	24	1	Male	Black	Florida	Electrocution	
57	October 1, 1956	Moses Lee Dunmore	21	20	1	Male	Black	Florida	Electrocution	
58	October 30, 1956	Leonard Lionel Bingham	26	23	3	Male	White	Texas	Electrocution	
59	November 7, 1956	Mack Drake	35	34	1	Male	Black	Mississippi	Gas chamber	
60	November 8, 1956	Henry Jackson	21	Unknown	Unknown	Male	Black	Mississippi	Gas chamber	
61	November 26, 1956	Samuel Woodrow Tannyhill	27	26	1	Male	White	Ohio	Electrocution	
62	November 30, 1956	James Franklin Bowman	47	45	2	Male	Black	Kentucky	Electrocution	
63	November 30, 1956	Charles C. DeBerry	21	19	2	Male	Black	Kentucky	Electrocution	
64	November 30, 1956	Robert Sheckles	22	20	2	Male	Black	Kentucky	Electrocution	
65	December 15, 1956	Artell Bernard Farley Jr.	27	25	2	Male	White	Washington	Hanging	

== Demographics ==
Gender
Male	65	100%
Female	0	0%
Ethnicity
Black	43	66%
White	20	31%
Hispanic	1	2%
Native American	1	2%
State
Mississippi	8	12%
Florida	7	11%
Texas	7	11%
Georgia	6	9%
New York	6	9%
California	5	8%
Ohio	4	6%
South Carolina	4	6%
Kentucky	3	5%
Pennsylvania	2	3%
Utah	2	3%
Alabama	1	2%
Arkansas	1	2%
Colorado	1	2%
Federal government	1	2%
Louisiana	1	2%
New Jersey	1	2%
New Mexico	1	2%
North Carolina	1	2%
Oklahoma	1	2%
Washington	1	2%
West Virginia	1	2%
Method
Electrocution	46	71%
Gas chamber	16	25%
Firing squad	2	3%
Hanging	1	2%
Month
January	11	17%
February	6	9%
March	4	6%
April	5	8%
May	4	6%
June	7	11%
July	5	8%
August	7	11%
September	6	9%
October	3	5%
November	6	9%
December	1	2%
Age
10–19	2	3%
20–29	37	57%
30–39	18	28%
40–49	4	6%
50–59	3	5%
60–69	1	2%
Total	65	100%

== Executions in recent years ==
Number of executions
1957	69
1956	65
1955	79
Total	213

Preceded by 1955	List of people executed in the United States in 1956	Succeeded by 1957
