= Meakes =

Surname list

Meakes is the surname of the following people

== Patronyme ==
- Bill Meakes (born in 1991), Australien rugby player
- Frank Meakes (1917–1989), Canadian politician in Saskatchewan
- Yasmin Meakes (born in 1994), Australian rugby player

== See also ==
- Meaker
