= List of people executed in the United States in 1954 =

Eighty-three people, eighty-one male and two female, were executed in the United States in 1954, sixty-seven by electrocution, twelve by gas chamber, and four by hanging.

The state of Vermont conducted its final executions this year, before abolishing capital punishment in 1965.

== List of people executed in the United States in 1954 ==
No.	Date of execution	Name	Age of person			Gender	Ethnicity	State	Method	Ref.
No.	Date of execution	Name	At execution	At offense	Age difference	Gender	Ethnicity	State	Method	Ref.
1	January 7, 1954	Walter Griffen	26	25	1	Male	White	New York	Electrocution	
2	January 7, 1954	Maurice O'Dell	28	27	1	Male	White	New York	Electrocution	
3	January 15, 1954	Dovie Blanche Dean	55	54	1	Female	White	Ohio	Electrocution	
4	January 22, 1954	Will Hardie	54	52	2	Male	Black	Alabama	Electrocution	
5	January 22, 1954	Paul Wright	19	18	1	Male	Black	Georgia	Electrocution	
6	January 29, 1954	Evan Charles Thomas	30	28	2	Male	White	California	Gas chamber	
7	February 5, 1954	Doyle Franklin Scott	31	30	1	Male	White	Georgia	Electrocution	
8	February 5, 1954	Luther Carlyle Wheeler	25	23	2	Male	White	Mississippi	Electrocution	
9	February 8, 1954	Francis Herbert Blair	32	30	2	Male	White	Vermont	Electrocution	
10	February 19, 1954	Henry Ford McCracken	36	34	2	Male	White	California	Gas chamber	
11	February 19, 1954	Arthur Fay Johnson	57	54	3	Male	White	New Mexico	Electrocution	
12	February 19, 1954	Walter Collins Green	25	24	1	Male	White	Texas	Electrocution	
13	March 5, 1954	Joseph Arthur Daugherty	54	52	2	Male	White	California	Gas chamber	
14	March 5, 1954	Florentino Ortega	26	25	1	Male	Hispanic	California	Gas chamber	
15	March 5, 1954	Lander Ray Gantt	31	27	4	Male	White	South Carolina	Electrocution	
16	March 5, 1954	Shelton H. Gainey	24	19	4	Male	White	South Carolina	Electrocution	
17	March 11, 1954	Henry Louis Allen	19	18	2	Male	Black	New York	Electrocution	
18	March 11, 1954	John Martin	19	18	2	Male	Black	New York	Electrocution	
19	March 12, 1954	Otis Glenn	23	22	1	Male	Black	South Carolina	Electrocution	
20	March 15, 1954	Oscar C. McGrew	28	26	2	Male	Black	Pennsylvania	Electrocution	
21	March 25, 1954	Charles D. Clark	43	41	2	Male	White	Texas	Electrocution	
22	March 27, 1954	Tom Ingham	31	Unknown	Unknown	Male	Black	West Virginia	Electrocution	
23	March 29, 1954	Clyde Vernon Ensminger	35	34	1	Male	White	Pennsylvania	Electrocution	
24	April 2, 1954	Henry Frank Decaillet	52	51	1	Male	White	California	Gas chamber	
25	April 5, 1954	William Patskin	46	43	3	Male	White	Pennsylvania	Electrocution	
26	April 23, 1954	Arthur Lee Grimes	23	21	2	Male	Black	Alabama	Electrocution	
27	April 23, 1954	Albert Lee Jones	23	21	2	Male	Black	Alabama	Electrocution	
28	April 23, 1954	Ferdinand A. Bourdlais	27	25	2	Male	White	Nevada	Gas chamber	
29	April 23, 1954	Willie Lee Gage	42	40	2	Male	Black	Texas	Electrocution	
30	May 7, 1954	William C. Jenkins	42	40	2	Male	Native American	Arkansas	Electrocution	
31	May 7, 1954	Raymond Carney	38	37	1	Male	Black	South Carolina	Electrocution	
32	May 17, 1954	Joseph Bibalo	24	20	4	Male	White	Pennsylvania	Electrocution	
33	May 21, 1954	Nathaniel Germany	29	22	7	Male	Black	Kansas	Hanging	
34	May 25, 1954	Lindsey Heard	20	19	1	Male	Black	Georgia	Electrocution	
35	May 26, 1954	John Clay Kensinger	29	28	1	Male	White	Virginia	Electrocution	
36	June 3, 1954	Charles Edward Mauck Klinedinst	29	27	2	Male	White	Texas	Electrocution	
37	June 4, 1954	Jessie Frank Jackson	23	22	1	Male	Black	Alabama	Electrocution	
38	June 4, 1954	Thomas William Reed	45	34	11	Male	Black	Kentucky	Electrocution	
39	June 11, 1954	Ozzie Jones	30	28	2	Male	Black	Georgia	Electrocution	
40	June 11, 1954	George Edward Grammer	36	35	1	Male	White	Maryland	Hanging	
41	June 12, 1954	Betty Evelyn Butler	26	24	2	Female	Black	Ohio	Electrocution	
42	June 15, 1954	Willie Jackson Jr.	17	16	1	Male	Black	Georgia	Electrocution	
43	June 15, 1954	Herman Lee Miller	18	17	1	Male	Black	Georgia	Electrocution	
44	June 24, 1954	Jimmy Richardson	32	31	1	Male	Black	Texas	Electrocution	
45	July 2, 1954	Charles Leo McGarry	66	65	1	Male	White	California	Gas chamber	
46	July 9, 1954	Russell George Muskus	33	29	4	Male	White	Ohio	Electroctution	
47	July 14, 1954	Charles Waymon Barnes	24	23	1	Male	Black	Texas	Electroctution	
48	July 15, 1954	Leroy Leonard Linden	34	34	0	Male	White	Nevada	Gas chamber	
49	July 15, 1954	Frank Alfonso Pedrini	46	46	0	Male	White	Nevada	Gas chamber	
50	July 15, 1954	Emile Hendricks Scott	21	20	1	Male	Black	New York	Electrocution	
51	July 16, 1954	William Merle Martin	44	42	2	Male	White	Kansas	Hanging	
52	July 17, 1954	Marvin Rayson	28	27	1	Male	Black	Texas	Electrocution	
53	July 22, 1954	William J. Vander Wyde	40	38	2	Male	White	New York	Electrocution	
54	July 27, 1954	Theodore Walker	22	21	1	Male	Black	New Jersey	Electrocution	
55	July 30, 1954	Joseph Jerry Johansen	26	25	1	Male	White	California	Gas chamber	
56	July 30, 1954	James Franklin Wolfe	42	41	1	Male	White	California	Gas chamber	
57	July 31, 1954	Bernard John O'Brien	34	32	2	Male	White	U.S. military	Hanging	
58	August 6, 1954	Sylvester Seymour	35	33	2	Male	Black	Georgia	Electrocution	
59	August 6, 1954	Samuel Brothers Nettles	31	30	1	Male	Black	Ohio	Electrocution	
60	August 12, 1954	Gerhard Arthur Puff	40	38	2	Male	White	Federal government	Electrocution	
61	August 17, 1954	James Beard	38	37	1	Male	Black	New Jersey	Electrocution	
62	August 26, 1954	John Dale Greene	24	22	2	Male	White	New York	Electrocution	
63	August 26, 1954	Barry Jacobs	22	20	2	Male	White	New York	Electrocution	
64	August 27, 1954	Willie Hayden	35	35	0	Male	Black	South Carolina	Electrocution	
65	September 1, 1954	Walter Eberle Whitaker Jr.	22	20	2	Male	White	Texas	Electrocution	
66	September 10, 1954	Alfred Sylvanus Dusseldorf	33	28	5	Male	Black	California	Gas chamber	
67	September 17, 1954	Howard Leroy Booker	35	33	2	Male	Black	Georgia	Electrocution	
68	September 28, 1954	Tanner Brock	57	55	2	Male	White	Florida	Electrocution	
69	September 28, 1954	Orion Nathaniel Johnson	19	16	3	Male	Black	Florida	Electrocution	
70	September 29, 1954	Maurice Sampson	21	19	2	Male	Black	Texas	Electrocution	
71	October 4, 1954	George Bailey Jr.	36	35	1	Male	Black	Florida	Electrocution	
72	October 4, 1954	James Henderson	47	46	1	Male	Black	Florida	Electrocution	
73	October 4, 1954	Avon Elwood North Sr.	37	34	3	Male	White	Florida	Electrocution	
74	October 14, 1954	Sterling Groom	43	40	3	Male	Black	Virginia	Electrocution	
75	October 29, 1954	Frederick Wallace Richard Heisler	33	30	3	Male	White	New Mexico	Electrocution	
76	November 5, 1954	Elliott Simon	55	55	0	Male	Black	Georgia	Electrocution	
77	November 8, 1954	Abraham Beard	18	17	2	Male	Black	Florida	Electrocution	
78	November 8, 1954	Leroy Williams	37	33	4	Male	Black	Florida	Electrocution	
79	November 10, 1954	James Dewey Johnson	30	30	0	Male	White	Mississippi	Electrocution	
80	November 19, 1954	Joe Lee Jones	17	16	1	Male	Black	Georgia	Electrocution	
81	November 19, 1954	Charles L. King	19	18	1	Male	Black	Georgia	Electrocution	
82	December 8, 1954	Donald Edward DeMag	31	29	2	Male	White	Vermont	Electrocution	
83	December 12, 1954	Calvin Eugene Davis	19	18	1	Male	Black	Georgia	Electrocution	

== Demographics ==
Gender
Male	81	98%
Female	2	2%
Ethnicity
Black	41	49%
White	40	48%
Hispanic	1	1%
Native American	1	1%
State
Georgia	12	14%
California	9	11%
Texas	9	11%
New York	8	10%
Florida	7	8%
South Carolina	5	6%
Alabama	4	5%
Ohio	4	5%
Pennsylvania	4	5%
Nevada	3	4%
Kansas	2	2%
Mississippi	2	2%
New Jersey	2	2%
New Mexico	2	2%
Vermont	2	2%
Virginia	2	2%
Arkansas	1	1%
Federal government	1	1%
Kentucky	1	1%
Maryland	1	1%
U.S. military	1	1%
West Virginia	1	1%
Method
Electrocution	67	81%
Gas chamber	12	14%
Hanging	4	5%
Month
January	6	7%
February	6	7%
March	11	13%
April	6	7%
May	6	7%
June	9	11%
July	13	16%
August	7	8%
September	6	7%
October	5	6%
November	6	7%
December	2	2%
Age
10–19	10	12%
20–29	27	33%
30–39	26	31%
40–49	12	14%
50–59	7	8%
60–69	1	1%
Total	83	100%

== Executions in recent years ==
Number of executions
1955	79
1954	83
1953	63
Total	225

Preceded by 1953	List of people executed in the United States in 1954	Succeeded by 1955
