= J. Miller Leavy =

American lawyer

J. Miller Leavy (August 12, 1905, Tucson, Arizona – January 1, 1995, Eagle Rock, California) was an American lawyer known for prosecuting several high-profile cases during his 41-year career as a district attorney in Los Angeles. During his tenure, he prosecuted several death penalty convictions, which led to the executions of twelve men and one woman by gas chamber.

A graduate of the University of California, Los Angeles (1927) and the University of Michigan Law School (1930), Leavy first drew national attention for his successful prosecution of Caryl Chessman, the "Red Light Bandit", in 1947. He also successfully prosecuted Barbara Graham in 1953 for bludgeoning an elderly woman to death, a trial that was depicted in the Academy Award winning film I Want to Live! (1958).

In 1957, Leavy made legal history when he became the first prosecutor in the United States to obtain a murder conviction on purely circumstantial evidence with his case against Robert Leonard Ewing Scott. He was portrayed by actor Linden Chiles in the 1976 television film Helter Skelter about Charles Manson.
