= List of people executed in the United States in 1957 =

Sixty-nine people, sixty-eight male and one female, were executed in the United States in 1957, forty-eight by electrocution, sixteen by gas chamber, and five by hanging.

The District of Columbia would conduct its final execution this year, before abolishing capital punishment in 1981.

Ross McAfee became the last person to be executed in the United States for burglary. He was executed in North Carolina for a burglary in which he attempted to rape and murder a 17-year-old girl.

== List of people executed in the United States in 1957 ==
No.	Date of execution	Name	Age of person			Gender	Ethnicity	State	Method	Ref.
No.	Date of execution	Name	At execution	At offense	Age difference	Gender	Ethnicity	State	Method	Ref.
1	January 3, 1957	John Edward McHenry	26	25	1	Male	Black	Texas	Electrocution	
2	January 4, 1957	Amos Reece	31	28	3	Male	Black	Georgia	Electrocution	
3	January 4, 1957	Leslie Webb	22	19	3	Male	Black	Texas	Electrocution	
4	January 11, 1957	John Gilbert Graham	24	23	1	Male	White	Colorado	Gas chamber	
5	January 11, 1957	Otto Austin Loel	46	43	3	Male	White	Oklahoma	Electrocution	
6	January 21, 1957	Joseph Lester Ezzell	42	40	2	Male	White	Florida	Electrocution	
7	February 5, 1957	Robert Hendricks	66	64	2	Male	White	Oklahoma	Electrocution	
8	February 8, 1957	John Allen	36	28	8	Male	White	California	Gas chamber	
9	February 8, 1957	Louis Franklin Smith	38	30	8	Male	White	California	Gas chamber	
10	February 8, 1957	John Felix Corbin	32	29	3	Male	White	Georgia	Electrocution	
11	February 8, 1957	Minor M. Sorber	39	35	4	Male	White	Mississippi	Gas chamber	
12	February 14, 1957	Thomas J. Edwards	23	20	3	Male	Black	U.S. military	Hanging	
13	February 14, 1957	Winfred D. Moore	23	19	4	Male	Black	U.S. military	Hanging	
14	February 28, 1957	Leonardo Salemi	44	39	5	Male	White	New York	Electrocution	
15	March 5, 1957	Jennings Edward Fields	33	30	3	Male	White	Georgia	Electrocution	
16	March 8, 1957	John Newberry	47	Unknown	Unknown	Male	White	Georgia	Electrocution	
17	March 14, 1957	MacDonald F. Browne	31	29	2	Male	White	New York	Electrocution	
18	March 15, 1957	Burton Wilbur Abbott	29	27	2	Male	White	California	Gas chamber	
19	March 15, 1957	Leon I. Domingo	23	20	3	Male	Black	Georgia	Electrocution	
20	March 15, 1957	Isiah Styles	34	33	1	Male	Black	Georgia	Electrocution	
21	March 15, 1957	Jimmy Allen	36	34	2	Male	Black	Tennessee	Electrocution	
22	March 19, 1957	Don Mitchell Colman	18	17	1	Male	Black	Georgia	Electrocution	
23	March 19, 1957	Robert Lee Elder	37	Unknown	Unknown	Male	Black	Georgia	Electrocution	
24	March 19, 1957	James Toler	39	38	1	Male	Black	Georgia	Electrocution	
25	March 22, 1957	Clarence Johnson	56	54	2	Male	Black	Alabama	Electrocution	
26	March 25, 1957	Harold Ellison Hill	25	22	3	Male	White	Georgia	Electrocution	
27	April 3, 1957	Ernest L. Ransom	26	22	4	Male	Black	U.S. military	Hanging	
28	April 4, 1957	Merle Wayne Ellisor	34	32	2	Male	White	Texas	Electrocution	
29	April 24, 1957	Yancy Albert McGowen	64	61	3	Male	White	Texas	Electrocution	
30	April 26, 1957	Robert Eugene Carter	28	24	4	Male	Black	District of Columbia	Electrocution	
31	May 6, 1957	Billy Thomas Gibbs	25	23	2	Male	White	Tennessee	Electrocution	
32	May 22, 1957	Leonard John Coey Sr.	58	56	2	Male	White	Arizona	Gas chamber	
33	May 31, 1957	John Joseph Michel	23	19	4	Male	Black	Louisiana	Electrocution	
34	June 4, 1957	John Lewis Gregory Jr.	23	Unknown	Unknown	Male	Black	Virginia	Electrocution	
35	June 7, 1957	Willie Marion Daniels	20	19	1	Male	Black	South Carolina	Electrocution	
36	June 21, 1957	James Bush	27	24	3	Male	Black	Louisiana	Electrocution	
37	June 21, 1957	Joseph Washington	34	31	3	Male	Black	Louisiana	Electrocution	
38	June 24, 1957	Harold Edward Shackleford	33	Unknown	Unknown	Male	Black	Ohio	Electrocution	
39	June 28, 1957	Thomas Lynn Johnston	25	24	1	Male	White	California	Gas chamber	
40	June 28, 1957	Eddie Lee Daniels	29	28	1	Male	Black	Maryland	Gas chamber	
41	July 5, 1957	Louis Chinn	31	28	3	Male	Black	Louisiana	Electrocution	
42	July 5, 1957	James Eugene Smith	35	31	4	Male	Black	South Carolina	Electrocution	
43	July 12, 1957	Lloyd Junius Dobie	26	24	2	Male	Black	Virginia	Electrocution	
44	July 15, 1957	William Owens Raulerson	49	47	2	Male	White	Florida	Electrocution	
45	July 19, 1957	John Edward Cheary	25	24	1	Male	White	California	Gas chamber	
46	July 26, 1957	Grady Justice	29	Unknown	Unknown	Male	Black	Georgia	Electrocution	
47	August 15, 1957	Miguel Santiago	29	28	1	Male	Hispanic	New York	Electrocution	
48	August 16, 1957	David Joel Hardenbrook	22	20	2	Male	White	California	Gas chamber	
49	August 16, 1957	Joseph Oscar Sheffield	28	24	4	Male	White	Louisiana	Electrocution	
50	August 21, 1957	George Krull	36	33	2	Male	White	Federal government	Electrocution	
51	August 21, 1957	Michael Krull	33	31	2	Male	White	Federal government	Electrocution	
52	August 21, 1957	Wilburn Monroe Hall	29	28	1	Male	White	Texas	Electrocution	
53	September 6, 1957	Fred Gordon Mullins	41	Unknown	Unknown	Male	Black	Georgia	Electrocution	
54	September 6, 1957	Donald Rufus Edwards	22	21	1	Male	Black	Louisiana	Electrocution	
55	September 13, 1957	Thomas Ervin Moore	42	40	2	Male	White	Missouri	Gas chamber	
56	September 14, 1957	John Wright	38	37	1	Male	Black	Texas	Electrocution	
57	September 16, 1957	Lem Dupree	59	58	1	Male	Black	Georgia	Electrocution	
58	September 30, 1957	Roosevelt Rhone	33	31	2	Male	Black	Florida	Electrocution	
59	October 2, 1957	Foster Seth Dement	50	49	1	Male	White	California	Gas chamber	
60	October 4, 1957	Henry C. Simpson	62	58	4	Male	White	California	Gas chamber	
61	October 4, 1957	John Henry White	26	Unknown	Unknown	Male	Black	Georgia	Electrocution	
62	October 11, 1957	Rhonda Belle Martin	50	44	6	Female	White	Alabama	Electrocution	
63	October 11, 1957	D.C. Bailey	23	21	2	Male	Black	Louisiana	Electrocution	
64	October 18, 1957	Raymond Allen Snowden	35	34	1	Male	White	Idaho	Hanging	
65	November 11, 1957	Donald Keith Bashor	38	35	3	Male	White	California	Gas chamber	
66	November 14, 1957	Joe Louis Thompson	21	20	1	Male	Black	Mississippi	Gas chamber	
67	November 21, 1957	David Taylor	44	42	2	Male	Black	New York	Electrocution	
68	November 22, 1957	Ross McAfee	39	38	1	Male	Black	North Carolina	Gas chamber	
69	December 3, 1957	Harvey John Collins	32	29	3	Male	White	Washington	Hanging	

== Demographics ==
Gender
Male	68	99%
Female	1	1%
Ethnicity
Black	35	51%
White	33	48%
Hispanic	1	1%
State
Georgia	14	20%
California	9	13%
Louisiana	7	10%
Texas	6	9%
New York	4	6%
Florida	3	4%
U.S. military	3	4%
Alabama	2	3%
Federal government	2	3%
Mississippi	2	3%
Oklahoma	2	3%
South Carolina	2	3%
Tennessee	2	3%
Virginia	2	3%
Arizona	1	1%
Colorado	1	1%
District of Columbia	1	1%
Idaho	1	1%
Maryland	1	1%
Missouri	1	1%
North Carolina	1	1%
Ohio	1	1%
Washington	1	1%
Method
Electrocution	48	70%
Gas chamber	16	23%
Hanging	5	7%
Month
January	6	9%
February	8	12%
March	12	17%
April	4	6%
May	3	4%
June	7	10%
July	6	9%
August	6	9%
September	6	9%
October	6	9%
November	4	6%
December	1	1%
Age
10–19	1	1%
20–29	28	41%
30–39	24	35%
40–49	8	12%
50–59	5	7%
60–69	3	4%
Total	69	100%

== Executions in recent years ==
Number of executions
1958	50
1957	69
1956	65
Total	184

Preceded by 1956	List of people executed in the United States in 1957	Succeeded by 1958
