= George and Michael Krull =

American criminals executed for kidnapping and rape

George Krull
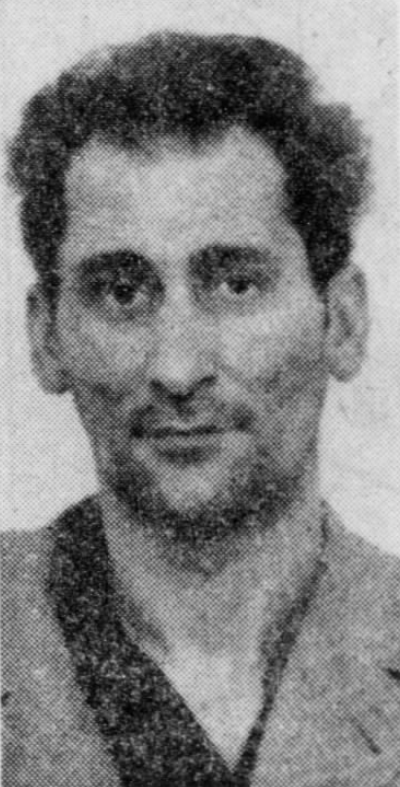
- Born: 1921; McKees Rocks, Pennsylvania, U.S.
- Died: August 21, 1957 (aged 36); Georgia State Prison, Georgia, U.S.
- Status: Executed by electrocution
- Convictions: Kidnapping; Rape; Interstate transportation a stolen vehicle
- Penalty: Death

Michael Krull
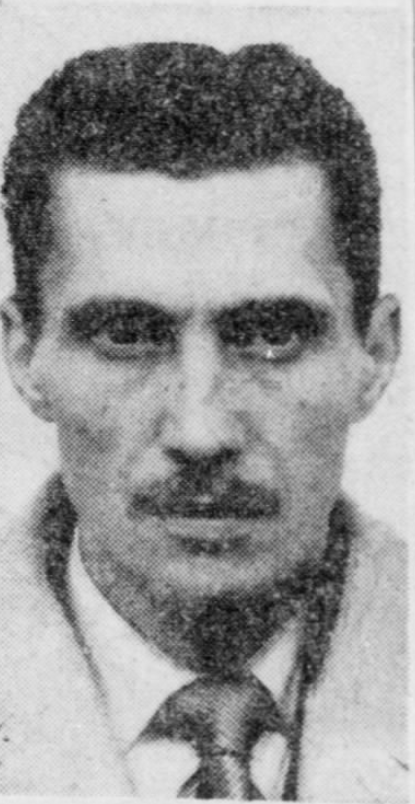
- Born: 1924; McKees Rocks, Pennsylvania, U.S.
- Died: August 21, 1957 (aged 33); Georgia State Prison, Georgia, U.S.
- Status: Executed by electrocution
- Convictions: Kidnapping; Rape; Interstate transportation of a stolen vehicle
- Penalty: Death

George Krull (1921–1957) and Michael Krull (1924–1957) were brothers from McKees Rocks, Pennsylvania who became the only people ever executed in Georgia on a federal death warrant. The two were executed for raping a woman in a national park. These were the last non-military executions for rape by the federal government. The last were in 1896, when all five members of the Rufus Buck Gang were hanged side-by-side in Arkansas for gang raping a woman during a violent crime spree.

== Early life ==
The Krull brothers both had lengthy criminal records dating back to their youths. Michael Krull served in the U.S. Army during World War II and married a British woman named Peggy while stationed in England in 1944. The couple was separated three months later when Michael Krull was arrested for absence without leave, robbery, and marrying without permission. Peggy Krull did not discover the whereabouts of her husband until March 1957, when she noticed a picture of him in a 1956 issue of True Detective. The picture showed Michael Krull being escorted out of a federal courtroom after he had been convicted and sentenced to death.

== Crime, trial, and execution ==
On April 14, 1955, the Krull brothers, who were riding with Edward Rubus Bice and Paul Leroy Allen, assaulted and kidnapped 52-year-old businesswoman Sunie Jones in Chattanooga, Tennessee. The four took her across state lines to Georgia, specifically to Chickamauga and Chattanooga National Military Park. During the kidnapping, the Krull brothers rode separately from Bice and Allen. Michael Krull, who was in the back of the car with Jones, started raping her. According to Jones, Michael "assaulted me for ever so long," after which he told his brother, "I'm through with her, do you want her?" The brothers then switched spots, after which George started raping her.

She was beaten badly enough that she had to be hospitalized. George took Jones to a secluded spot in the park, where he raped her again and told her that this was where he would dig her grave. However, a forest ranger noticed the two and intervened. George fled without Jones, but he, his brother, Bice, and Allen were all soon arrested.

Because the Krull brothers had taken Jones over state lines, the crime became a federal case under the Federal Kidnapping Act. The two also faced federal rape charges since Jones was raped in a national park. Although the victim did not die, federal prosecutors sought death sentences for the Krull brothers, citing their lengthy criminal records and the brutality of the attack. At one point, they compared the brothers to hungry wolves, hunting the streets for a woman to rape. George pleaded not guilty by reason of insanity, while Michael pleaded not guilty. However, the prosecutor read a statement that Michael had previously made to the police, in which he claimed that Jones had consented to sex.

Edward Bice pleaded guilty being an accessory after the fact to kidnapping and was sentenced to five years in prison. He began his sentence at the United States Penitentiary in Terre Haute, Indiana on June 20, 1955, and was paroled on March 12, 1957. He was arrested for selling illegal moonshine in Tennessee in January 1960.

Bice and Allen, who was not charged, both testified against the Krull brothers, who were found guilty on all counts. Prior to the verdict, the jury asked the judge whether the two would ever become eligible for parole if they imposed a life sentence. The judge stated that parole eligibility was out of the hands of the court. The jury sentenced the Krull brothers to death for rape and life in prison for kidnapping. The judge also imposed a five-year sentence on the brothers for transporting a stolen vehicle across state lines. Afterwards, Jones said, "I certainly think they deserve it."

"I wouldn't have been happy if it hadn't turned out like it did. It was a terrible thing to go through and I hope another woman never has to experience it. I'm so happy I'm still living."

The Krull brothers had their death sentences reversed on appeal over a minor legal error in March 1957. However, they were resentenced to death in April 1957, after U.S. District Judge Frank Arthur Hooper rejected the pleas of their lawyers for life terms on the grounds that nobody had died. Upon having his death sentence reinstated, Michael Krull commented, "It was all prejudice. When your local people commit rape they get just 10 or 20 years sometimes. They didn't give us much time - April 26 to May 9." After President Dwight D. Eisenhower declined to commute their death sentences, the Krull brothers attempted to commit suicide. They then wrote a letter to Sunie Jones, pleading with her to ask for clemency on their behalf. However, Jones refused to reply to the letter.

"They didn't answer me when I pleaded with them on that day in April of 1955. And when they begged me, I didn't answer. They wrote that I could save them from the electric chair if I could write to the Pardon and Parole Board. They wrote, 'We know how you will feel about it, but hope you will have a heart.' My heart told me what to do and I didn't answer."

The Krull brothers won a second resentencing hearing on appeal. However, their death sentences were again reinstated by U.S. District Judge Frank Hooper on August 2, 1957. The Krull brothers were executed in the electric chair at Georgia State Prison in Reidsville on August 21, 1957. George was 34 years old at the time of his death and Michael was 32. Following the executions, their sister, Ann Pletcher, complained that her brothers had been treated unfairly.

"Why did they have to die? There are people running the streets today who did more than they did. They couldn't get a break in the South, because they hate 'Yankees' down there. I'm through with politics. The only time they know you is when they want something. When President Eisenhower turned down the clemency appeals of the boys it didn't surprise me. He was an Army man and has a heart of stone."

The Krull brothers were the last men to be executed by the federal government for rape. Their executions were the first non-military federal executions for rape in over 60 years, with the last being that of the five members of the Rufus Buck Gang in 1896.

== See also ==
- Capital punishment by the United States federal government
- List of people executed by the United States federal government
- List of people executed in the United States in 1957
- List of people executed by electrocution
