= Robert Leonard Ewing Scott =

American murderer (1897-1987)

Robert Leonard Ewing Scott (July 27, 1897 – August 15, 1987) was an American convicted murderer. Scott was convicted in 1959, in California, of having murdered his wife; the case was one of the first to establish a "bodyless" murder, that is, a murder in which no body had been discovered to bear out that there had been a crime committed.

== The marriage ==
L. Ewing Scott, and his wife Evelyn Throsby Scott (née Mumper), having met at a society party and married in Mexico, shared a considerable wealth that Evelyn possessed prior to their marriage. After five years of marriage, on May 16, 1955, Evelyn went missing. Concerned friends were given various explanations by Scott- that Evelyn had been hospitalized, or had run off.

In July 1955, Leonard Scott began a relationship with a divorcée named Harriet Livermore.

On March 5, 1956, Evelyn's brother Raymond Throsby, suspicious of Leonard, reported Evelyn's disappearance to the police, beginning the investigation.

== Investigation and trial ==
Los Angeles police arrested Scott and charged him with forgery and fraud for the looting of his wife’s bank accounts after they visited Evelyn's safe deposit boxes and found only envelopes filled with sand, as Leonard had withdrawn large sums from Evelyn's safe deposit boxes and deposited those funds in his own accounts.

Having been indicted by a Los Angeles grand jury on 13 counts of forgery and theft, but released on $25,000 bail, Scott fled to Canada. He was arrested a year later, on April 9, 1957, when J.G. Rosaire Baillargeon of the Canadian customs authorities stopped him as he was re-entering Canada at Windsor Ontario after a visit to Detroit to buy a car. During his absence, the grand jury had produced an additional indictment against Scott for murder.

Although Evelyn's body was never found, her dentures, eyeglasses, and some of her personal items were found among buried ashes near the incinerator on the couple's estate located at 217 North Bentley Ave., in the affluent Bel Air community of Los Angeles.

Scott's case was groundbreaking, as it was the first case in U.S. history of someone being convicted of murder purely on circumstantial evidence, without the victim's body having been located. The prosecution was led by district attorney J. Miller Leavy.

After being convicted of the murder, Scott was given a life sentence. In December 1959, the appeals court upheld his conviction, despite his complaint that the original trial court had failed to establish corpus delicti. In 1960, Scott was transferred to San Quentin Prison.

Ewing was released in 1978. Parole was offered in 1974, but Ewing refused, claiming that it did not apply, as he was being wrongfully held. After his release, he admitted that he had committed the murder. He died in 1987 at age 90.

== Sources ==
- Diane Wagner, Corpus Delcti: The True Story of L. Ewing Scott, Convicted of Murder Without a Confession or a Corpse.
- The Lady Vanishes, Time Magazine, Jan. 6, 1958
- Estate of Scott (1960) 181 CA2d 605

== See also ==
- Corpus delicti
- John George Haigh
