= Linden Chiles =

American actor (1933–2013)

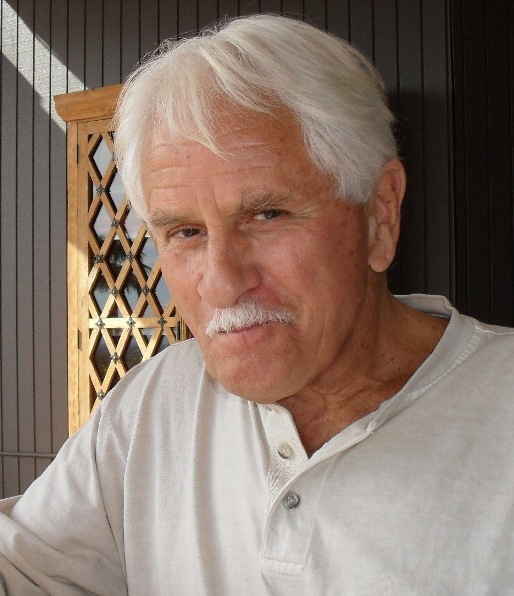
- Born: Truman Linden Chiles; March 22, 1933; St. Louis, Missouri, U.S.
- Died: May 15, 2013 (aged 80); Topanga, California, U.S.
- Occupation: Actor
- Years active: 1960–2013

Truman Linden Chiles (March 22, 1933 – May 15, 2013) was an American character actor.

== Early years ==
Chiles was born in St. Louis, Missouri but grew up in Barrington, Illinois. He graduated from Northwestern University with a Bachelor of Arts degree in journalism (majoring in advertising). He also studied at Purdue University and UCLA and served in the Army.

== Career ==
Chiles portrayed Charles Hanson on CBS's East Side/West Side, Steve Kirkland on NBC's Convoy, Henry DeWitt on NBC's Banacek, and Paul Hunter on NBC's James at 15.

Chiles made four guest appearances on CBS's Perry Mason; in three of the episodes he played the role of the defendant: Joe Davies in "The Case of the Jealous Journalist" (1961), Herbert Simms in "The Case of the Promoter's Pillbox" (1962), and Clyde Darrell in "The Case of the Telltale Tap" (1965). In his other appearance he played the role of murderer Vernon Elliot in the 1963 episode, "The Case of the Surplus Suitor".

In 1967, Chiles guest-starred on Mannix in the episode "Turn Every Stone".

Chiles guest-starred on such television series as Going My Way; The Fugitive; The Man from U.N.C.L.E.; The Time Tunnel; Land of the Giants; The Invaders; The Munsters; Hawaii Five-0; The Rockford Files; Barnaby Jones; The Twilight Zone; The Virginian; Cannon; Simon & Simon; Quincy, M.E.; Murder, She Wrote; Falcon Crest; Ironside, and Baywatch, among many others.

== Death ==
Linden Chiles died on May 15, 2013, after falling from the roof of his home in Topanga, California. He was 80 years old.

== Selected filmography ==
- 1960 The Wizard of Baghdad as Soldier (uncredited)
- 1961 Sanctuary as Randy
- 1961 Wild in the Country as Doctor (uncredited)
- 1964 Marnie as Office Worker (uncredited)
- 1964 Shock Treatment as Al Simon, Intern (uncredited)
- 1965 A Rage to Live as Brock Caldwell
- 1966 Incident at Phantom Hill as Dr. Hanneford
- 1966 Texas Across the River as Yellow Knife
- 1966 The Time Tunnel (TV Series - S1 E4 - Day the Sky Fell In) as Commander Newman
- 1968 Counterpoint as Lieutenant Long
- 1969 Eye of the Cat as Bendetto
- 1975 Who Is the Black Dahlia? (TV movie) as Dr. Coppin
- 1976 Helter Skelter (TV movie) as J. Miller Leavy
- 1980 Where the Buffalo Roam as Reporter #2
- 1982 Forbidden World as Dr. Gordon Hauser
- 1982 The Incredible Hulk as T.H. Cunningham
- 1984 Cloak & Dagger as Airport Security Chief
- 1989 Girl Talk as Hal Frost
- 1990 The Forbidden Dance as Bradley Anderson
- 1993 Amore! as B.S. Scarborough
- 1994 The Glass Shield as Sergeant Berry Foster
- 1996 Fly Away Home as Television Anchor
- 1999 The Annihilation of Fish as Doctor
- 2010 Old Friends as Craig Hargroves
- 2010 Three Shadows as Lord Henry / Zebulon Whatley
- 2011 Mr. Twistedface as Stephan DeRossillini
- 2012 The Mystic Tales of Nikolas Winter as Nikolas Winter
- 2012 The Burning Within as Sergeant Craig Hargroves
- 2012 Brother Drop Dead as Bud Stiltner
- 2013 The Haunted Men as Craig Hargroves
- 2013 Doctor Mabuse as Inspector Norbert Von Wenk
- 2013 The Rising Light as Nikolas Winter
- 2014 Road to Paloma as Bob, The Mechanic
