= List of people executed in the United States in 1955 =

Seventy-nine people, seventy-eight male and one female, were executed in the United States in 1955, fifty-three by electrocution, twenty-one by gas chamber, four by hanging, and one by firing squad.

== List of people executed in the United States in 1955 ==
No.	Date of execution	Name	Age of person			Gender	Ethnicity	State	Method	Ref.
No.	Date of execution	Name	At execution	At offense	Age difference	Gender	Ethnicity	State	Method	Ref.
1	January 4, 1955	Frank J. Roscus	35	33	2	Male	White	New Jersey	Electrocution	
2	January 7, 1955	James Willie Morgan	18	17	1	Male	White	Georgia	Electrocution	
3	January 11, 1955	Eugene Monahan	45	43	2	Male	White	New Jersey	Electrocution	
4	January 12, 1955	Donald Hawkins Brown	26	24	2	Male	White	Texas	Electrocution	
5	January 14, 1955	Tom Johnson	42	39	3	Male	Black	Louisiana	Electrocution	
6	February 4, 1955	Walter Thomas Byrd	43	41	2	Male	White	California	Gas chamber	
7	February 10, 1955	Henry Matthews	18	16	2	Male	White	New York	Electrocution	
8	February 11, 1955	John Richard Jensen	29	28	1	Male	White	California	Gas chamber	
9	February 17, 1955	Romulo Rosario	38	36	2	Male	Hispanic	New York	Electrocution	
10	March 1, 1955	Chastine Beverly	25	21	4	Male	Black	U.S. military	Hanging	
11	March 1, 1955	James L. Riggins	28	24	4	Male	Black	U.S. military	Hanging	
12	March 1, 1955	Louis M. Suttles	26	22	4	Male	Black	U.S. military	Hanging	
13	March 3, 1955	Gerald Albert Gallego	26	26	0	Male	White	Mississippi	Gas chamber	
14	March 4, 1955	Carl James Folk Sr.	56	55	1	Male	White	Arizona	Gas chamber	
15	March 4, 1955	Allen Donaldson	28	26	2	Male	Black	Mississippi	Gas chamber	
16	March 18, 1955	Roy Tarrance	49	45	4	Male	White	Kentucky	Electrocution	
17	March 18, 1955	Leonard Tarrance	25	22	3	Male	White	Kentucky	Electrocution	
18	April 1, 1955	Dock Booker	46	44	2	Male	Black	Missouri	Gas chamber	
19	April 15, 1955	Howard Jackson	44	42	2	Male	Black	Georgia	Electrocution	
20	April 15, 1955	Tom Williams	46	45	1	Male	Black	Georgia	Electrocution	
21	April 15, 1955	Arthur Waitus	37	33	4	Male	Black	South Carolina	Electrocution	
22	April 15, 1955	Samuel Thomas Voss	29	27	2	Male	Black	Tennessee	Electrocution	
23	April 18, 1955	John H. McVeigh	34	32	2	Male	White	Florida	Electrocution	
24	April 25, 1955	Grover Cleveland Edwards	35	33	2	Male	White	Pennsylvania	Electrocution	
25	April 25, 1955	Benjamin Franklin Robinson	36	35	1	Male	Black	Pennsylvania	Electrocution	
26	April 28, 1955	August Charles LaFontaine	24	23	1	Male	White	Mississippi	Gas chamber	
27	May 3, 1955	Jose Philippinos Cruz	26	25	1	Male	Asian	New Jersey	Electrocution	
28	May 3, 1955	Felipe Nieves Rios	29	28	1	Male	Asian	New Jersey	Electrocution	
29	May 3, 1955	Joaquin Rodriguez	33	32	1	Male	Asian	New Jersey	Electrocution	
30	May 6, 1955	Johnson William Caldwell	33	32	1	Male	White	California	Gas chamber	
31	May 13, 1955	Leonard Jessie Baldwin	32	29	3	Male	White	California	Gas chamber	
32	May 18, 1955	Anthony J. Zilbauer	52	51	1	Male	White	California	Gas chamber	
33	May 20, 1955	Harry Francis Butcher Jr.	29	28	1	Male	White	Texas	Electrocution	
34	June 3, 1955	Barbara Elaine Graham	31	29	2	Female	White	California	Gas chamber	
35	June 3, 1955	Emmett Raymond Perkins	46	44	2	Male	White	California	Gas chamber	
36	June 3, 1955	John Albert Santo	54	52	2	Male	White	California	Gas chamber	
37	June 8, 1955	Henry William Meyer	65	63	2	Male	White	Texas	Electrocution	
38	June 10, 1955	Robert Lee Sauls Jr.	31	29	2	Male	Black	Louisiana	Electrocution	
39	June 10, 1955	William C. Thomas	32	30	2	Male	Black	Maryland	Hanging	
40	June 17, 1955	Sylvester Fuller	25	Unknown	Unknown	Male	Black	Georgia	Electrocution	
41	June 20, 1955	John E. Wiggins	59	58	1	Male	Black	Mississippi	Gas chamber	
42	June 23, 1955	Mack C. Lewis	21	19	2	Male	Black	Mississippi	Gas chamber	
43	July 1, 1955	Don Jesse Neal	35	31	4	Male	White	Utah	Firing squad	
44	July 9, 1955	Calman Cooper	47	42	5	Male	White	New York	Electrocution	
45	July 9, 1955	Harry Stein	57	52	5	Male	White	New York	Electrocution	
46	July 9, 1955	Nathan Wissner	43	38	5	Male	White	New York	Electrocution	
47	July 11, 1955	William J. Lorain	34	31	3	Male	White	Connecticut	Electrocution	
48	July 11, 1955	William Maxwell Jr.	28	26	2	Male	Black	Pennsylvania	Electrocution	
49	July 14, 1955	Alonzo Russell	42	41	1	Male	Black	Virginia	Electrocution	
50	July 15, 1955	Richard Scales	29	28	1	Male	Black	North Carolina	Gas chamber	
51	July 18, 1955	John Bourne Donahue	22	20	2	Male	White	Connecticut	Electrocution	
52	July 18, 1955	Robert Nelson Malm	31	30	1	Male	White	Connecticut	Electrocution	
53	July 25, 1955	Patrick Alexander Lance	31	30	1	Male	White	Pennsylvania	Electrocution	
54	July 25, 1955	Elijah Thompson Jr.	23	22	1	Male	Black	Pennsylvania	Electrocution	
55	August 1, 1955	Harry E. Kirkendoll	33	31	2	Male	Black	Tennessee	Electrocution	
56	August 1, 1955	Charlie N. Sullins	38	36	2	Male	White	Tennessee	Electrocution	
57	August 18, 1955	Floyd Ray Jackson	21	20	1	Male	Black	Texas	Electrocution	
58	August 19, 1955	Walter Johnson	18	17	1	Male	Black	Mississippi	Gas chamber	
59	August 29, 1955	Louis Gillard	54	Unknown	Unknown	Male	Black	Florida	Electrocution	
60	August 31, 1955	Lester Edward Bartholomew	38	38	0	Male	White	Arizona	Gas chamber	
61	September 2, 1955	Alfred Stokes	24	22	2	Male	Black	New Jersey	Electrocution	
62	September 2, 1955	Harry Wise	23	21	2	Male	Black	New Jersey	Electrocution	
63	September 2, 1955	Albert Wise	24	23	1	Male	Black	New Jersey	Electrocution	
64	September 8, 1955	Edward J. Nichols	28	27	1	Male	Black	New York	Electrocution	
65	September 8, 1955	Clarence M. Reed	32	31	1	Male	Black	New York	Electrocution	
66	September 15, 1955	Robert Logan Crenshaw Jr.	42	41	1	Male	Black	Tennessee	Electrocution	
67	September 16, 1955	Ed Milam	25	24	1	Male	Black	Kentucky	Electrocution	
68	September 20, 1955	Harold Euin Berry	28	26	2	Male	White	California	Gas chamber	
69	September 26, 1955	George Lee Capps	24	22	2	Male	White	Pennsylvania	Electrocution	
70	September 26, 1955	John Wesley Wable	26	23	3	Male	White	Pennsylvania	Electrocution	
71	October 7, 1955	Marvin H. Chasteen	41	39	2	Male	White	South Carolina	Electrocution	
72	October 31, 1955	Chester Forster Dyer	20	19	1	Male	White	Florida	Electrocution	
73	December 2, 1955	Willie Junior Daniels	24	24	0	Male	Black	South Carolina	Electrocution	
74	December 2, 1955	Clay Daniels	23	23	0	Male	Black	South Carolina	Electrocution	
75	December 9, 1955	Murry Garfield Gilmore	32	31	1	Male	White	Mississippi	Gas chamber	
76	December 12, 1955	Samuel J. Hornbeck	38	36	2	Male	White	Florida	Electrocution	
77	December 18, 1955	Mose Robinson	21	20	1	Male	Black	Mississippi	Gas chamber	
78	December 23, 1955	Chester Howard Merrifield	37	34	3	Male	White	Kentucky	Electrocution	
79	December 23, 1955	David Nichols	55	54	1	Male	Black	Kentucky	Electrocution	

== Demographics ==
Gender
Male	78	99%
Female	1	1%
Ethnicity
White	40	51%
Black	35	44%
Asian	3	4%
Hispanic	1	1%
State
California	9	11%
Mississippi	8	10%
New Jersey	8	10%
New York	7	9%
Pennsylvania	7	9%
Kentucky	5	6%
Florida	4	5%
Georgia	4	5%
South Carolina	4	5%
Tennessee	4	5%
Texas	4	5%
Connecticut	3	4%
U.S. military	3	4%
Arizona	2	3%
Louisiana	2	3%
Maryland	1	1%
Missouri	1	1%
North Carolina	1	1%
Utah	1	1%
Virginia	1	1%
Method
Electrocution	53	67%
Gas chamber	21	27%
Hanging	4	5%
Firing squad	1	1%
Month
January	5	6%
February	4	5%
March	8	10%
April	9	11%
May	7	9%
June	9	11%
July	12	15%
August	6	8%
September	10	13%
October	2	3%
November	0	0%
December	7	9%
Age
10–19	3	4%
20–29	32	41%
30–39	23	29%
40–49	13	16%
50–59	7	9%
60–69	1	1%
Total	79	100%

== Executions in recent years ==
Number of executions
1956	65
1955	79
1954	83
Total	227

Preceded by 1954	List of people executed in the United States in 1955	Succeeded by 1956
