= Barbara Graham =

American convicted murderer (1923–1955)

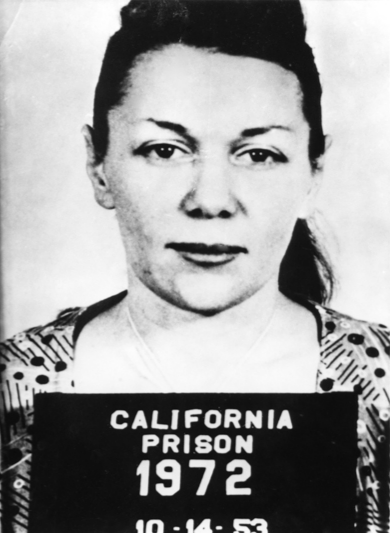
- 1953 mugshot of Graham
- Born: Barbara Elaine Ford; June 26, 1923; Oakland, California, U.S.
- Died: June 3, 1955 (aged 31); San Quentin State Prison, California, U.S.
- Other names: Barbara Wood, Bloody Babs
- Children: 3
- Status: Executed by gas chamber
- Motive: Robbery
- Convictions: First degree murder Perjury
- Penalty: Death

Barbara Elaine "Bonnie" Graham (née Ford; June 26, 1923 – June 3, 1955) was an American criminal convicted of murder. She was executed in the gas chamber at San Quentin Prison on the same day as two convicted accomplices, Jack Santo and Emmett Perkins, all of whom were involved in a robbery that led to the murder of an elderly widow. Nicknamed "Bloody Babs" by the press, Graham was the third woman in California to be executed by gas.

Her story of adult criminal activity is told in the highly fictionalized 1958 film I Want to Live!, in which she was portrayed by Susan Hayward, who won the Academy Award for Best Actress.

== Early life ==
Graham was born Barbara Elaine Ford in Oakland, California to Hortense Ford from Santa Cruz, who earned her living through prostitution. Hortense was of Portuguese (Azorean) descent on her father's side, the original family name having been Furtado. On February 23, 1925, Hortense, still unwed, gave birth to a second daughter, Claire Elizabeth. On October 10, 1929, at the age of 23, Hortense married Joseph Wood Sr. in Alameda. Hortense, Barbara and Claire all changed their surnames to Wood. Hortense and Joseph's son, Joseph Robert Wood Jr., was born on March 27, 1930; however Joseph Sr. died on January 19, 1930, at the age of 28, before his son's birth.

When Ford was two, her mother, who was still in her late teens, was arrested and sent to reform school and Ford was placed in foster care in which she alleged that she was beaten and treated poorly. Upon release at age 21, Hortense refused to allow Ford to live with her. Ford was raised by strangers and extended family and, although she was intelligent, she had a limited education. As a teenager, she was arrested for vagrancy and sentenced to serve time at Ventura State School for Girls, the same reform school where her mother had been.

Released from reform school in 1939, Ford tried to make a new start for herself. She married Harry Kielhamer (1913–1993), a U.S. Coast Guardsman, in 1940, and enrolled in a business college and soon had her first two children. The marriage was not a success and, by 1942, she was divorced. Harry Kielhamer was awarded custody of their two sons. Over the next several years, she was married twice more, but each of these attempts at a more traditional lifestyle failed.

After this string of failures, Ford is said to have become a worker in the sex trade, as her mother had before her: reportedly, during World War II, she plied her trade as what was known in some circles as a "seagull", or a prostitute who "flocked" in pairs or groups near naval bases. It is supposed that Ford began working near the Oakland Army Base, Oakland Naval Supply Depot, and Alameda Naval Air Station. In 1942, she and other "seagulls" traveled to Long Beach, California and San Diego. She was arrested on vice charges in these naval cities and in San Pedro, California. At 22, with her good looks, red hair, and sex appeal, she worked for a time in San Francisco for a brothel madam named Sally Stanford. She soon became involved in gambling and illegal drug circles, cultivating a number of friends who were ex-convicts and known career criminals. She served a five-year sentence for perjury as a false alibi witness for two petty criminals, serving her sentence at the California Women's State Prison at Tehachapi, California. After her stint in state prison, Ford moved to Reno, Nevada and then Tonopah, Nevada. She obtained work in a hospital and as a waitress, but soon got on a bus for Los Angeles. There, she got a room on Hollywood Boulevard and returned to prostitution. In 1953, she married Henry Graham, who worked as a bartender at one of her frequent haunts. With him she had a third child, named Tommy.

== Murder of Mabel Monohan ==
Henry Graham was addicted to illegal drugs and known as a hardened but low-level criminal. Through him, Barbara met his friends Jack Santo and Emmett "The Weasel" Perkins, both with criminal records. She started an affair with Perkins, who told her about a 64-year-old widow, Mabel Monohan, who was alleged to keep a large amount of cash and jewelry in her home in Burbank, California.

Monohan was a retired vaudeville performer who had previously worked the Keith-Albee circuit. Her ex-son-in-law was 74-year-old Luther B. Scherer (1879–1957), a multi-millionaire who was well known through his ownership of various gambling clubs in locations such as Palm Springs and casinos in Las Vegas. It is speculated that he had deep ties to various crime syndicates. Monahan's daughter, Iris, had divorced Scherer two years prior and received the Burbank residence in the divorce settlement. Iris shortly thereafter married a different man and moved to New York, leaving her mother, Mabel Monohan, to reside in their former home. Monohan and Scherer had remained close friends after the divorce and their continued friendship piqued public interest, gossip, and rumors that would later prove deadly. One rumor that was widely circulated amongst criminals and in local bars was that Scherer, due to his deep trust of Monohan, had left $100,000 ($1,044,292 value in 2022) cash stashed in a safe within the residence.

The following account is based on Baxter Shorter's confession and John True's witness testimony:

On March 8, 1953, Graham had dinner in the San Fernando Valley with Perkins, Santo, True, and Shorter, a safe-cracker. Shorter stated that he initially did not want Graham to participate because she was a "dame" but Perkins convinced him that it was the only way Monohan would open the front door.

On the evening of March 9, 1953, Graham reportedly gained entry by knocking on the door and asked to use Monohan's phone due to car trouble. Once Monohan opened the door for Graham, Perkins, Santo, and True came in behind her, followed later by Shorter. Shorter claimed that when he entered the home Monohan was already bleeding and her mouth was gagged. The gang tore up Monohan's home looking for the safe, money and/or jewels to no avail. True stated that Graham handed a gun to Perkins and told him to "Knock her out!" Shorter claimed that at this point he threw Perkins to the floor and convinced True to remove the gag because he noticed Monohan was having trouble breathing. True did not mention these events and stated that Graham began to viciously beat Monohan. After the gang left, Santo assumed Monohan was dead. However Shorter, once alone, purportedly called for help from a pay phone. The address given to the operator was incorrect and Monohan was discovered two days later by her gardener.

The robbery attempt was a futile effort as nothing of value was found in the house. They would later learn at trial that $15,000 in jewels and valuables ($156,630 value in 2022) was located in a purse in the closet. Monohan's daughter Iris offered a $5,000 ($52,210 value in 2022) reward for information leading to the arrest and conviction of her mother's murderer(s).

== Arrest and conviction ==
On March 26, 1953, police arrested and questioned five men in connection with the murder of Monohan. Three were known associates of L.A. gangster Mickey Cohen, along with another man and Shorter. All of the men knew Monohan through Scherer; however, they were all released due to lack of evidence.

Shorter, who was shaken at the thought of going to the gas chamber should the police figure out his involvement, volunteered to turn state's evidence and gave the police details of the Monohan murder and attempted robbery. He stated that he had seen Perkins hit Monohan with the gun and that he was shaken having witnessed the murder. However, Shorter's statement was leaked and he was later kidnapped and murdered by Perkins and Santo after his release from police custody shortly after his confession.

Upon hearing of Shorter's disappearance and probable death, William Upshaw, a convicted felon, volunteered to testify before the grand jury. Upshaw testified that he had been in the car with Barbara Graham, Perkins, Santo, True, and Shorter the night prior to the murder as the group conducted surveillance on Monohan's home and ran through the robbery plans. He stated that he decided not to participate out of fear of retaliation from "Tutor" Scherer. Subsequently, John True agreed to become a state witness in exchange for immunity from prosecution. In court, True testified against Graham, who continually protested her innocence.

The press nicknamed Graham "Bloody Babs", reflecting the public disgust for her alleged actions. Having no alibi, Graham doomed her own defense when she accepted another inmate's offer to pay $25,000 (equivalent to $300,840 in 2025) to the inmate and "a friend" who would provide a false alibi. The inmate, however, was working to reduce her own sentence, and the "friend", who offered to say he was with Graham the night of the murder, was a police officer. Meeting with Graham to plan the alibi story, he insisted that she admit to him that she had indeed been at the scene of the crime. The officer was recording the conversation. This attempt to suborn perjury, plus the recorded admission that she indeed had been at the scene of the widow Monohan's senselessly violent murder, abutted by her previous perjury conviction, completely destroyed Graham's credibility in court. When questioned about her actions at the trial, she said, "Oh, have you ever been desperate? Do you know what it means not to know what to do?"

Graham was convicted, while the informant's sentence was commuted to time served, and she was immediately released. The prosecution was led by district attorney J. Miller Leavy.

== Appeals and execution ==
Graham, Santo, and Perkins were all sentenced to death for the robbery and murder. Graham appealed her sentence while at the California Institution for Women in Chino, California. Her appeals failed, and on June 2, 1955, she was transferred to San Quentin State Prison. On June 3, 1955, she was scheduled to be executed at 10:00 a.m., but that was stayed by California governor Goodwin J. Knight until 10:45 a.m. At 10:43 a.m., Knight stayed the execution until 11:30 a.m. Graham protested, "Why do they torture me? I was ready to go at ten o'clock." At 11:28 a.m. she was led from her cell and strapped in the gas chamber; she requested a blindfold so she would not have to look at the observers. Her last words were "Good people are always so sure they're right." Advised that taking a deep breath after the cyanide pellets were dropped would make her death easier, she replied, "How the hell would you know?"

Barbara Graham was buried in Mount Olivet Cemetery, San Rafael, California.

== In popular culture ==
Actress Susan Hayward won the Academy Award for Best Actress for playing Graham in the 1958 film I Want to Live!, a fictionalized version of events which suggests that Graham was innocent since it was based on letters Graham wrote to a journalist. The film is from Graham's point of view and includes details differing from real life, in particular, the manner in which the police found and arrested Graham.

Reporter Gene Blake, who covered Graham's murder trial for the Los Angeles Daily Mirror, dismissed the movie as "a dramatic and eloquent piece of propaganda for the abolition of the death penalty." Los Angeles Herald-Express reporter Bill Walker also exposed the inaccuracies of the film in his article in the April 1959 issue of Cavalier, "Exposing Hollywood's 'I Want to Live' Hoax", and in a 1961 book titled The Case of Barbara Graham. However, while the movie may have been fictionalized, there is still some doubt about Graham's guilt and the manner in which it was 'proved'.

Marcia Clark, a former deputy district attorney for Los Angeles County and the lead prosecutor in the O.J. Simpson murder trial, has authored Trial by Ambush, a true crime book exploring the Barbara Graham case, set for publication on December 1, 2024.

Graham was also portrayed by actress Lindsay Wagner in the 1983 TV movie I Want to Live!

The jazz/pop singer Nellie McKay had a touring production titled I Want To Live! that tells the story through standards, original tunes, and dramatic interludes.

== See also ==
- Capital punishment in California
- Capital punishment in the United States
- List of people executed in California
- List of people executed in the United States in 1955
