= John Francis Roche =

Executed American serial killer (1927–1956)

- Roche c. 1954
- Born: September 6, 1927; Port Chester, New York, U.S.
- Died: January 26, 1956 (aged 28); Sing Sing Prison, New York, U.S.
- Other names: "Devil of Yorkville" "Jack"
- Status: Executed by electrocution
- Conviction: First degree murder
- Penalty: Death

Details
- Victims: 4–6
- Span of crimes: 1952(?) 1953 – 1954
- Country: United States
- State: New York
- Date apprehended: June 5, 1954

John Francis Roche (September 6, 1927 – January 26, 1956), known as the Devil of Yorkville, was an American serial killer, burglar, and rapist who committed at least four murders in the Yorkville district of New York City from 1953 to 1954. In addition to his known crimes, Roche also claimed to have committed two other murders that other people had previously been convicted of, and while one of those convictions was eventually overturned, he was never officially connected to either crime. For the murder of 14-year-old Dorothy Westwater, Roche was sentenced to death and executed at Sing Sing in 1956.

== Early life ==
Roche was born on September 6, 1927, in Port Chester, New York, one of three children to immigrant parents from Ireland. The family moved out of Port Chester shortly after his birth and settled in New York City. Roche's father, Patrick, was an alcoholic who repeatedly assaulted his wife and at one point attempted suicide. Roche's mother made money by working as a prostitute in a tenement flat. According to psychological reports, Roche spent a considerable amount of time in confinement in his youth.

At age 12, Roche began committing petty crimes, many of which landed him on probation. At age 13, he was sent to a reformatory school. In his adolescent years, his mother abandoned him, and Roche began escalating his crimes. In 1951 he was detained for armed robbery, for which he was given a short prison term, getting out sometime before July 1952.

== Murders ==
=== Confirmed ===
On November 15, 1953, Roche burglarized an apartment that belonged to 85-year-old Rosa Chronik. Investigators allege that while he was ransacking the place, Rosa interrupted him, and in a panic Roche stabbed her to death and fled.

Marion Brown

On April 8, 1954, Roche stalked 17-year-old Marion Brown through the apartment complex she lived in and where she worked as a waitress. Once in a secluded area of a hallway, Roche attacked Brown and proceeded to rape her, while Brown attempted to scream for help, but Roche eventually killed her and fled. After the murder, Roche got a call from his fiancée, Yolande Graspo. Graspo exclaimed she was frightened at the news of Brown's murder and wanted Roche to walk her home, unknown to her that Roche was the killer. Roche agreed to lead Graspo home, and he did, leaving her unharmed.

Dorothy Westwater

On April 16, Roche flagged down a taxi, driven by 43-year-old Alexander Jablonka. With the same knife used to kill Brown, Roche stabbed Jablonka to death and fled. During the period of time after Jablonka's murder, there was speculation that his murder and the murder of Brown were perpetrated by the same person, something the Yorkville police denied, saying there was not enough evidence and the news could cause a panic among Yorkville residents. On June 2, Roche approached 14-year-old Dorothy Westwater after she left her apartment room for school. He attacked her and forcefully dragged her under a staircase. He proceeded to stab Westwater in the neck, back, and chest a total of eight times, before raping her and shattering her skull with a lead pipe. By the time Westwater was found, she was still alive but in dreadful condition, having to be rushed to the hospital, where she died as a result of her injuries.

=== Claimed ===
Roche might have committed his first murder on July 26, 1952, when 23-year-old Josephine Brown was strangled to death on a deserted street in Queens. For her murder, police arrested 18-year-old Oliver L. Freeman, an area rapist known to police as "The Batman", and he was convicted of first-degree manslaughter for Brown's death. He was sentenced to 10 to 20-years imprisonment.

On August 22, 1953, 22-year-old sailor Edward Bates was bludgeoned and stabbed to death in Queens. Not long after, police began investigating Paul A. Pfeffer, a man with a lengthy criminal history, and he was arrested on August 27. Pfeffer was convicted of Bates' murder in January 1954 and sentenced to 20 years imprisonment.

== Investigation ==
The series of brutal slayings caused a moral panic among the Yorkville population, with authorities overwhelmed with the string of murders, finally having to admit that there was a link between each of the killings. It was reported that men in the general area of the murders accompanied young girls to protect them from the killer. Residents and the media alike dubbed the elusive killer the "Devil of Yorkville". On June 5, 1954, Roche was arrested by patrolman Gustave Roniger. Roniger noticed Roche driving erratically on the wrong side of the road and pulled him over. Since Roche could not produce a driver's license he was arrested and booked to the closest police station. When asked what he was doing, Roche simply replied, "Just out for a pleasant day." Once in custody, the license plate on the vehicle matched that of a vehicle that was reported stolen. In the trunk of the vehicle police uncovered a knife and a blood stain on a lead pipe, which investigators involved in Westwater's murder were made aware about.

Roche (right) being escorted out of court by an officer

Roche was interrogated and confessed to a total of six murders, including those of Edward Bates and Josephine Brown. Two days after Roche's arrest, an 18-year-old black boy named Norman Roye was arrested in New York City for the murder of his neighbor 66-year-old Isadora Goomes. Roye eventually confessed to three murders that dated back to January 1954. Due to the close proximity and the timing, the press and news outlets compared Roche and Roye together on a daily basis.

== Trial ==
Since two of Roche's murder confessions involved the convictions of two people, an outcry of public support for both Oliver Freeman and Paul Pfeffer to stand a re-trial. Queens County District Attorney Vincent Quinn stated however that Roche's confessions were "without basis in fact", and said four out of the six murders he confessed to held actual truth. Despite this, a re-trial of Paul Pfeffer was granted, but Roche was due to stand trial for the murder of Dorothy Westwater first. During the trial, Roche did not deny his guilt, claiming he did not want to live out the rest of his days in prison and wanted to die. He also claimed he was sorry for killing Westwater, claiming he thought she was 18 when he attacked her, but was upset to learn she was 14. Roche's attorney James Murray compared Roche's mind to scrambled eggs, saying his client was insane. Roche stated he would rather be executed than be sent to a mental hospital.

Roche expressed some remorse over Westwater's murder due to her age, saying "I am sorry . . . she was only 14. I thought she was 18." Roche was convicted of first degree murder after the jury did not recommend mercy. His execution was scheduled for August 24, 1955. However, Roche was unable to be executed that day because his testimony was needed at the retrial of Paul Pfeffer. Pfeffer had already been convicted of a separate homicide, that of Mellon Byrd, and an assault on Harry Meyer, for which he was sentenced to life in prison. In January 1956, the charge against Pfeffer for Bates' murder was dismissed.

== Execution ==
Roche was scheduled to be executed by the electric chair on January 26, 1956. Before his execution, he admitted he hadn't killed Bates, and only said so out of sympathy for Pfeffer since they both "had seamy lives". That night, he ate his last meal, which consisted of fried chicken, french fries, potatoes, tomato salad, strawberry shortcake, rolls, ice cream, coffee, and cigarettes. Roche also met with a chaplain in the hours before he was put to death. He was then led into the death chamber at 11:01 p.m. by Rev. Thomas J. Donovan. He had no last words. The electric chair was on for three minutes, and Roche was pronounced dead at 11:04 p.m.

Pfeffer was paroled for the murder of Mellon Byrd on November 27, 1972.

== See also ==
- Norman Roye
- Capital punishment in New York (state)
- List of people executed in New York
- List of serial killers in the United States
- List of people executed in the United States in 1956
