= Donald DeMag =

Last person executed in Vermont

Donald Edward DeMag
- DeMag after his arrival at the Vermont State Prison (August 20, 1948)
- Born: December 15, 1922; Burlington, Vermont, U.S.
- Died: December 8, 1954 (aged 31); Vermont State Prison, Vermont, U.S.
- Spouse: Virginia Frances LaFountaine (m. 1945; div. 1950)
- Children: 2
- Status: Executed by electrocution
- Convictions: First degree murder Second degree murder Hit and run Driving with unassigned plates Grand larceny Petit larceny
- Penalty: Life imprisonment (August 10, 1948); Death (December 19, 1953)

Details
- Victims: 2
- Date: March 11, 1948; August 2, 1952
- Country: United States
- State: Vermont

Donald Edward DeMag (December 15, 1922 – December 8, 1954) was a convicted murderer who became the last person executed by the U.S. state of Vermont.

== Life and first murder ==
Donald Edward DeMag was born in Burlington, Vermont on December 15, 1922. After being left partially deaf at the age of three from scarlet fever, and spent the rest of his life suffering from seizures. In 1945, he married 16-year-old Virginia Frances LaFountaine. They would have two children together. He had prior convictions for hit and run, driving with unassigned plates, petit larceny, and grand larceny. In 1940, DeMag, then 17, was charged with purse-snatching. He had been frightened off several times when the victims screamed. Due to his age and a lack of a criminal history at the time, he received a suspended sentence. In 1946, DeMag had been charged with petit larceny after stealing a woman's steel girder and selling it to a junk dealer to make "a fast dollar." On March 25, 1947, DeMag received two concurrent 30-day jail terms after being convicted of driving an automobile with unassigned plates and leaving the scene of a minor car accident.

On March 11, 1948, DeMag, who had lost his job in New York several weeks earlier and whose wife was pregnant with their second child, robbed and murdered Francis E. Racicot, an 81-year-old harness maker whom he was previously friendly with. After Raciot refused to loan him money, DeMag got to an argument with him, then beat him to death with a stove shaker and took his wallet. Several days later, he took his wife to a dance, confessed to the murder, and asked her not to implicate him. She did not, but DeMag was arrested the next day after a neighbor saw a red jacket on the roof of DeMag's home the next day and called the police, who were searching for a man in a red jacket. After making a written confession, he was charged with first degree murder, which carried a mandatory death sentence under Vermont law at the time. Immediately after his indictment, however, DeMag was committed to the Vermont State Hospital due to concerns about his sanity.

Officials determined that DeMag had epilepsy and had suffered from serious mental illness ever since he was three years old. Vermont Attorney General Clifton G. Parker told a judge that DeMag had previously had psychotic periods in which he would've been considered legally insane, albeit in the state's view, he was legally sane at the time of the murder. Still, after taking his psychiatric issues into account, Parker allowed DeMag to plead guilty to second degree murder, thus sparing him from a possible death sentence. On August 10, DeMag pleaded guilty and was immediately sentenced to life imprisonment at hard labor at the Vermont State Prison in Windsor. DeMag's wife attended the trial, but filed for divorce in 1950, once it became clear that her husband would be serving substantial prison time.

== Escapes, second murder, and trial ==
DeMag was initially a model inmate. Due to his conduct in prison and his ailments, he was granted special privileges. However, on the night of August 27, 1950, DeMag escaped from prison. He placed a dummy in his cell cot, then scaled the 16-foot wall with a 14-foot signpost taken from a prison shop. He was recaptured by a suspicious police officer, who thought he was trying to illegally enter Canada. DeMag admitted to being an escaped convict and was returned to prison.

DeMag eventually became cellmate with Francis Herbert Blair, a career criminal who was serving a 7 to 10-year sentence for breaking and entering and larceny. He had 22 warrants against him, including an additional five years on another count in Vermont and 14 years for automobile theft and a parole violation in Ohio. Blair was also a suspect in a series of burglaries in Massachusetts.

On July 30, 1952, DeMag and Blair escaped from prison. DeMag stole the keys to a laundry truck after the driver left them inside, then drove it through the prison's steel gates. He and Blair continued to drive the truck until they ran out of gas, then successfully evaded the large posse that was searching for them.

On the night of August 3, the two men entered the home of Ronald Weatherup through a kitchen window. When Weatherup came downstairs to investigate the noise, Blair beat him unconscious with an iron bar. They then went upstairs, where Weatherup's wife, Elizabeth Weatherup, had locked herself in a bathroom. The two men broke the door down and Blair bludgeoned her unconscious with an iron bar. They then changed clothes, took whatever valuables they could find, and fled the house. After regaining consciousness, Ronald Weatherup went to a neighbor and contacted the police. Weatherup's wife was taken to the hospital. In severe shock and suffering from severe brain damage, she died early the next morning. That noon, DeMag and Blair surrendered after being cornered by the police.

DeMag and Blair, who were both arrested while wearing coats and pants with Weatherup's name on them, confessed and were charged with first degree murder. They both pleaded not guilty by reason of insanity. Blair's family had a history of mental illness. His mother had been declared insane when he was three and his father then declared an incurable alcoholic, he and his siblings were sent to an orphanage. However, after being examined, doctors concluded that the two men were legally sane.

Blair was tried first. Doctors argued over whether was legally insane at the time. A psychiatrist for the defense testified that Blair was suffering from dementia praecox. Two psychiatrists for the prosecution testified that Blair was sane and had not attacked the Weatherups on an irresistible impulse. On March 28, 1953, Blair was convicted of first degree murder and sentenced to death by electrocution. DeMag was tried in December. One doctor said that DeMag had no organic brain damage and was fully conscious of his actions at the time of the murder. On December 19, 1953, DeMag was also convicted of first degree murder and sentenced to death.

== Execution and burial ==
Blair, 32, was executed in the state's electric chair at the Vermont State Prison on February 8, 1954. He was the first person to be executed in Vermont since 1947. His last meal consisted of pork chops, french fries, vanilla ice cream, and coffee. According to his chaplain, Blair, who recited the Lord's Prayer as he was strapped into the chair and until the first current was applied, "died a reconciled sinner."

On December 6, 1954, Governor Lee E. Emerson, who had initially granted a stay of execution so he could further review the case, announced that he would not grant clemency to DeMag. He described the action as the most difficult decision of his career.

DeMag was executed on December 8, 1954. He prayed silently as he walked to the electric chair. Struggling to sleep in his last 24 hours alive, DeMag, who was described as calm but somewhat frightened, was given a mild sedative the night before and another that morning. He said he was sorry for what he had done and spent most of his final hours listening to the radio, reading newspapers, and writing several letters to his family. The last meal consisted of two pork chops, a baked potato, chocolate milk, chocolate cake, and chocolate ice cream. He was buried at Holy Family Cemetery in Essex Junction, Vermont.

== Later capital case in Vermont ==
Although DeMag was the last person executed by Vermont, he was not the last person to be sentenced to death by a Vermont court. Lionel Goyet, a soldier who was Absent Without Leave for the fifth time, robbed and killed a farmhand, and was sentenced to death in 1957. His sentence was commuted six months later, and Goyet was conditionally pardoned in 1969. He had no further problems with the law, and died in 1980.

The death penalty was effectively abolished by Vermont in 1965. It remained as a possible sentence if a defendant was convicted of murdering a prison employee or law enforcement officer, but was never used. As a result, the possibility of a death sentence in such cases was removed from state statutes by the Vermont General Assembly in 1987.

== See also ==
- Capital punishment in Vermont
- List of people executed in Vermont
- List of most recent executions by jurisdiction
- List of people executed in the United States in 1954

== Bibliography ==
- John Stark Bellamy II (2007). Vintage Vermont Villainies: True Tales of Murder & Mystery from the 19th and 20th Centuries (Woodstock, Vt.: Countryman) ISBN 0-88150-749-0
- Daniel Allen Hearn (2008). Legal Executions in New England: A comprehensive reference, 1623–1960 (Jefferson, NC: McFarland) ISBN 0-7864-3248-9
- Wilson Ring, "Death penalty comes full circle in Vt.", Rutland Herald, 2005-05-01

Preceded by Francis Blair	Executions carried out in Vermont	Succeeded by none
