= Meaker =

Meaker /mi.ker/ is a surname. Notable people with the surname include:

- Emeline Meaker, first woman legally executed by the state of Vermont
- Marijane Meaker, American novelist and short story writer
- Michael Meaker (born 1971), Welsh footballer and coach
- Stuart Meaker, English cricketer

Fictional characters:

- Harold Meaker and his wife Ethel from the BBC television series Rentaghost
