= Emeline Meaker =

American murderer (1838–1883)

Emeline Lucy Meaker
- Born: June 1838; Barre, Vermont, U.S.
- Died: March 30, 1883 (aged 44); Vermont State Prison, Windsor, Vermont, U.S.
- Children: Almon Meaker
- Status: Executed
- Conviction: First degree murder
- Penalty: Death

Emeline Lucy Meaker (sometimes reported as Lucy Emeline Meaker) (June 1838 – March 30, 1883) was the first woman who was legally executed by Vermont. In 1883, Emeline Meaker was convicted of and hanged for the severe abuse, mistreatment, and subsequent murder of her husband's nine-year-old orphaned half-sister Alice Meaker in the small rural town of Duxbury, Vermont, on 23 April 1880.

== Abuse of Alice Meaker ==
Sometime in or around April 1879, a child welfare worker approached Emeline Meaker (1838-1883) and her husband, Horace C. Meaker (1831-1904), in the small rural town of Duxbury, Vermont, to ask if they would consider taking Horace's eight-year-old younger half-sister Mary Jane "Alice" (1870-1880) and seven-year-old younger half-brother Henry (1872-1934) into their house, as the children were living in an overcrowded orphanage.

Mary Jane (better known by her nickname Alice) Meaker and her brother Henry Meaker were the biological children of Horace's father Orrin Meaker (died in 1878) and his second wife, Mary Germain (1850-1904) and were originally from the small rural town of Charlotte, Vermont; shortly after Orrin Meaker had died, and Mary Germain, who was now a very poor and destitute widow and single mother as well as a farmer, was left to raise the children alone (despite living in rural poverty), neighbors soon began to claim and make rumours that Mary Germain was a "unfit mother" who was unable to take "proper care of her children" and this rumor had quickly spread throughout the entire town, and they soon reported their claims to the overseer of the local poor and destitute rural population, and the town's overseer subsequently ordered Mary Germain to give her two children Alice and Henry away to live and reside in a orphanage, since she had already lost custody of her two children as a direct result of the neighbor's claims. Horace C. Meaker was subsequently offered a stipend of US$400 (equivalent to $13,821 in 2025) in cash, to care for Alice and Henry and take them out of the orphanage, and so he had agreed to take both Alice and Henry into the family house.

On May 6, 1879, Alice Meaker and her brother Henry Meaker had left the overcrowded orphanage and subsequently went to live with Horace and Emeline Meaker in the small rural town of Duxbury. At the time, Horace and Emeline Meaker lived with their two children, their 19-year-old daughter named Eleanor "Nellie" Meaker (1859-1912), and their 17-year-old son named Lewis Almon Meaker (1861-1893). At the time, Emeline and Horace Meaker were poor and they lived on a farm that they rented (the year before) in the town; the neighbors had already known Emeline Meaker as a "harsh and domineering woman" who lacked any love or mercy even for her own children, and showed "no sign of affection" and appeared to be "cold and distant" for "almost all of the time", and she could "very easily" become frightening when upset or angry; the neighbors already had their suspicions of Meaker after her daughter and son had appeared to be mistreated by her, and after seeing her daughter and son covered in bruises and wounds several times before, and they also suspected that her own husband Horace might be afraid of her, and they especially had their suspicions of her, after her one-year-old infant son Cecil died from mysterious causes while under her care, on 10 February 1861. As a result of her "harsh, domineering, cold and frightening" character and personality which she was widely known and renowned for, neighbors had tried to avoid upsetting or angering Meaker (especially during a converation with her) and tried to avoid intervening in "[her] personal life".

Emeline Meaker was not pleased with the arrangement and disliked both Henry and Alice for living in their house, and shortly after Henry and Alice had arrived in the home, Emeline Meaker began to especially despise Alice (and also Henry, to a much lesser extent) and she frequently beat, starved, and otherwise mistreated Alice and had even threatened to kill her on numerous occasions and, according to some reports, frequently insulted Alice and called her "a damned little bitch" and bellitled and humiliated her in front of others.

Although Emeline Meaker would sometimes also occasionally beat, whip, abuse, belittle and/or mistreat Henry, once in an while (or so), she had primarily focused her abuse and mistreatment upon Alice, who reportedly received the most severe abuse and mistreatment and whom Meaker had reportedly depsised the most. Emeline Meaker would often force Alice to do heavy physical labor and would frequently beat her or whip her severely either for no reason or for the most little of reasons. According to several neighbors, Meaker would severely beat Alice with a cane, sticks, or pieces of wood outside repeatedly until she bled and/or was "all bruised up", often beating her much harder if she cried or ran away, and Alice's cries could be reportedly heard by some people from about half a mile away, whenever Meaker beat her; on several occasions, several visitors to the home noticed that Meaker severely beat and abused Alice in front of them and then blamed Alice for being a "troubled child" and a "damned little bitch"; on one occasion, after giving Alice a severe beating, Meaker yelled at her husband Horace, and asked him why did he even bring the "little nasty thing (referring to Alice) to come live with her and torment her constantly". According to several eyewitnesses, Horace was rarely home, and therefore had failed to stop Meaker from abusing his younger half-sister Alice, although he did reportedly observe that Meaker would occasionally beat, whip, and/or otherwise mistreat Alice whenever he was home and would occasionally blame him for taking Alice into their house. Neighbors had frequently observed that Meaker would belittle, beat, whip, and abuse Alice "all the time" and "on a regular basis", both "in the house and outside of the house". As the months had passed by, the abuse that Alice was subjected to, had escalated and significantly worsened.

In the summer and fall of 1879, neighbors had noticed Meaker would often severely beat and abuse Alice outside on a regular basis, while screaming at her and cursing her outloud; when Alice would cry or run away, Meaker would chase after her and beat her even harder; according to eyewitnesses, Meaker had severely beaten Alice so hard, that one time Alice had suddenly collapsed to the ground and then became completely unresponsive for the next several hours; on several occasions, Meaker would also force Alice to stand outside, while she harshly screamed at Alice and repeatedly cursed her outloud and threatened to kill her; on one occasion, Meaker had forced Alice to go and stand outside before telling Alice that she would "beat her to death", and then proceeded to severely beat Alice using various heavy objects in a harsh manner repeatedly, while Alice screamed, cried, and begged for mercy; on another occasion, Meaker beat Alice with a heavy barrel stove repeatedly in a "merciless" way while completely ignoring her cries. Meaker also constantly complained to the neighbors that Alice was a "troubled child" who was "out of control" and wouldn't listen and stated that she did not know why she (referring to Alice) was with her in the same house. Contrary to Meaker's claims, neighbors had described Alice as a "good and kind young girl". Ultimately, even though neighbors soon became fully aware of the severe abuse and rumors of Meaker's severe abuse and mistreatment of Alice soon quickly spread throughout the small rural town of Doxbury, nobody contacted the authorities or otherwise tried to stop the abuse and several neighbors later had reported that they did not want to "intervene in [her] personal life", as they feared that if they did, Meaker would only beat and abuse Alice more severely and that they were afraid that the "beatings would only get worse".

Shortly before Alice's death, Meaker threatened that she would eventually "find a way" to kill Alice.

About one week before Alice's death, when two adolescent-aged girls visited the house and had a conversation with Emeline Meaker, the girls noticed that a young girl (who was Alice Meaker) was crying, covered in bruises, and appeared extremely underweight, and desperately attempted to look and search "for something" in the pantry; when the girls asked about who the girl was, Emeline Meaker stated that the girl was Alice Meaker, and then stated that she did not "think it was right for Alice to live with her, and that she considered sending Alice away somewhere".

According to reports, nine-year-old Alice Meaker was reportedly supposed to "find service for a farmer, which would have begun one week after her death, had she not have died".

== Murder of Alice Meaker ==
According to the testimony which was provided by Meaker's 18-year-old son, Almon, on the early morning hours of April 22, 1880, Meaker ordered Almon to hire a horse and carriage and purchase a lethal dose of strychnine from an pharmacist, with the explanation that he intended to kill rats on his family's farm; Almon obeyed his mother and did so, later that day at around 3:00 p.m. in the afternoon. The next day, on the late evening hours of April 23, shortly after around 9:00 p.m., Meaker and Almon both took and seized Alice from the house, placed a sack over Alice's head, and used the carriage to take her to a remote area outside the small neighboring rural town of Waterbury, near what is now the Little River State Park currently. Shortly after they had soon arrived at a clearing by a stream, Almon handed the strychnine to his mother and she poured it into a drink which she then gave to Alice, whom she had then repeatedly urged to drink and swallow. Shortly afterwards, when Alice had screamed and thrashed about in reaction to the strychine poisoning, Meaker then grabbed Alice, sat her down on her lap, and then forcibly held her hand over Alice's mouth to keep the girl from crying out (while she gently patted Alice's forehead to sooth her), keeping it there until Alice was dead, and then Meaker and Almon had buried Alice's body in a hole they had dug beneath a large thicket bush and then Meaker and Almon had abruptly left the scene and had returned back to their house, shortly afterwards.

== Aftermath ==
Two days later on 25 April, when several observant neighbors realized that Alice was not outside and nowhere to be seen, they asked Emeline Meaker where Alice was and why wasn't she outside as usual; in response, Emeline Meaker lied and falsely claimed that Alice had ran away from home through the window two nights ago and again stated her claim that she was "out of control" and wouldn't listen; as a result of her "harsh and frightening" character, the neighbors had "very politely" asked Meaker whether they should report Alice's disappearance to the authorities; in response, Meaker had abruptly refused. When Alice was eventually nowhere to be seen and Meaker and the family did not look for her, the authorities were contacted the next day on 26 April. Alice's disappearance was investigated, and the next day on 27 April, while being questioned regarding Alice's disappearance, Almon Meaker had abruptly confessed to the local sheriff, that both he and Meaker took Alice from the house on the late evening hours of 23 April, poisoned her, and buried her body, and showed the authorities the location where he and Meaker had buried Alice's body after murdering her. After Alice's body was recovered by the authorities, the autopsy was conducted; Alice was found to have indeed been murdered by poisoning (as large traces of the poison were found in her stomach and minimal traces of the poison were evident on her lips and mouth), and her body was extremely starved and malnourished, battered, and covered in severe bruises and wounds. Later that same day, after it was ultimately confirmed that both Almon and Meaker took and seized Alice from her house on the late evening hours of 23 April and had subsequently poisoned her before burying her body, both Almon and Meaker were arrested by the authorities for the murder of nine-year-old Alice Meaker and were then sent to prison. During their court trial in 1882, Almon and Meaker were found guilty and were both initially sentenced to death. However, Almon's sentence was commuted by the Vermont Legislature to life imprisonment because it was believed that he was dominated and manipulated by his mother into helping her poison and murder Alice and bury her body. Almon's confession was published in the newspaper on the date set for Meaker's execution. It was reported that Meaker acted violently while in jail, but calmed as her execution date drew nearer.

== Execution ==
On March 30, 1883, the morning of her scheduled execution, Meaker ate a large beefsteak, three potatoes, a slice of bread and butter, a piece of meat pie, and a cup of coffee. Then, at her request, she went to view the gallows, remarking that it was not half as bad as she thought it would be. She sent a message to her husband through the sheriff, and then ate a lunch consisting of two boiled eggs, two slices of toast, one potato, one doughnut, and a cup of coffee.

Over 125 spectators gathered in the prison guardroom at the Vermont State Prison in Windsor County, and it was reported that the sheriff was besieged with requests for passes to witness the hanging. When Meaker was finally led to the gallows, and asked (by slip of paper as she was deaf) if she had anything to say, Meaker said in a low voice, "May God forgive you all for hanging me, an innocent woman. I am as innocent as that man standing here," indicating a deputy. None of her family was present at the execution and her husband and children did not accept her body for burial after the execution.

== Aftermath of the execution and deaths and burials of the members of the Meaker family ==
Emeline Meaker's 18-year-old son Almon Meaker spent the rest of his life in prison, for his role in the poisoning and murder of nine-year-old Alice Meaker, where he died thirteen years later on 28 November 1893, in the prison cell at Windsor, Windsor County, Vermont, at the age of 32.

After his first wife's execution, Horace C. Meaker lived a relatively obscure life and mostly away from public view; five years later in 1888, Horace married Weltha E. Rogers (1874-1950) and took her to be his second wife; only two years after they had married, Horace Meaker and Weltha E. Rogers got divorced and their marriage had ended in 1890, and Weltha E. Rogers married John Herman Rogers (1867-1957) the next year in 1891, with whom she had only one son who had died in infancy in 1894. Horace C. Meaker himself had died on 22 January 1904, in Barre, Washington County, Vermont, at the age of 72. His body is buried in the Elmwood Cemetery in Barre, Washington County, Vermont. Because Horace Meaker was a army veteran who had fought as a soldier in the American Civil War as a young adult man, his body was buried in the military veteran section of the cemetery and his gravestone is decorated with six American flags and with the honorary and military title Veteran of the Civil War. As a result, his body was buried alongside the bodies of four other adult men who had also fought in the American Civil War and also had American flags and also had the honorary and military titles of Veterans of the Civil War as well.

Approximately more than one month before Alice Meaker had been poisoned and murdered, her biological mother Mary Germain had married her second husband, George Germain (1850-1902) on 22 March 1880, and took him to be her second husband, and she had five children with him over a period of about seven years, before he had died by suicide on 2 June 1902 in Richmond, Chittenden County, Vermont. Mary Germain subsequently also had lived a relatively obscure life and mostly away from public view as well, and she had died on 21 October 1907, in Burlington, Chittenden County, Vermont, at the age of 57. Her body is buried in the Riverview Cemetery in Burlington, Chinttenden County, Vermont, alongside her second husband Gerorge Germain whose body was also buried there.

Alice Meaker's younger brother Henry Meaker had lived to adulthood, subsequently also lived a relatively obscure life and mostly away from public view as well, and he had died on 23 June 1934, in Huntington, Chinttenden County, Vermont, at the age of 61. Due to the significant lack of information about him, it is currently unknown if Henry Meaker had ever married any woman or if he ever had any children and his exact burial place still remains unknown currently to this day.

== See also ==
- Capital punishment in Vermont
- List of people executed in Vermont
