= List of people executed in Vermont =

The following is a list of people executed by the U.S. state of Vermont from 1778 to 1954.

Capital punishment was abolished in Vermont in 1972. From 1778 to 1954, 28 people were executed in Vermont, 22 by hanging, 5 by electrocution, and 1 by firing squad. Five were executed by local authorities and two by the military prior to 1864, when Vermont became the first state to move executions to its state prison, where the remaining 21 were executed. All but one of those executed were white. 26 of the executions were of males, while 2 were of females.

== Executions 1778–1954 ==
Name	Race	Age	Sex	Date of Execution	County	Method	Crime	Victim(s)	Governor
David Redding	White	24	M	June 11, 1778	Bennington	Hanging	Treason	N/A	Thomas Chittenden
Cyrus Dean	White		M	November 11, 1808	Chittenden	Hanging	Murder	Capt. Jonathan Ormsby and Pvt. Asa Marsh, white	Isaac Tichenor
John Cummings	White		M	July 12, 1813	Chittenden (Military)	Hanging	Desertion	N/A	Jonas Galusha
David Lord	White		M	July 28, 1813	Chittenden (Military)	Firing squad	Desertion	N/A	Jonas Galusha
Samuel Godfrey	White		M	February 13, 1818	Windsor	Hanging	Murder	Thomas Hewlett, 46, white (guard)	Jonas Galusha
Luther Virginia	Black		M	January 14, 1820	Franklin	Hanging	Murder	Rufus W. Jackson, white	Jonas Galusha
Archibald Bates	White	33	M	February 6, 1839	Bennington	Hanging	Murder	Harriet Jane Bates, 29, white (sister-in-law)	Silas H. Jennison
William Barnett	White	58	M	January 20, 1864	Chittenden	Hanging	Murder	Anne Barnett, 35, white (wife)	J. Gregory Smith
Sandy Kavanaugh	White	61	M	January 20, 1864	Chittenden	Hanging	Murder	Katharine Kavanaugh, white (wife)	J. Gregory Smith
John Ward	White		M	March 21, 1868	Chittenden	Hanging	Murder	Ephriam Griswold, 57, white	John B. Page
Hiram Miller	White	30	M	June 25, 1869	Windsor	Hanging	Murder-Robbery	Joshua Goshing and Abigail Gowing, 56 and 51, white	John B. Page
Henry Welcome	White	18	M	January 20, 1871	Chittenden	Hanging	Murder-Robbery	Perry Russell, 72, white	John Wolcott Stewart
Henry Boudreau Gravelin	White		M	March 14, 1879	Windsor	Hanging	Murder	Herbert White, white (Note: Also suspected of the murders of his first wife and two French Canadians.)	Redfield Proctor
John P. Phair	White	33	M	April 10, 1879	Rutland	Hanging	Murder-Robbery	Ann Frieze (girlfriend)	Redfield Proctor
Asa S. Magoon	White	59	M	November 28, 1879	Washington	Hanging	Murder	Rufus Streeter, 70, white	Redfield Proctor
Edward Tatro	White	23	M	April 2, 1880	Franklin	Hanging	Murder-Rape	Alice A. Butler, 20, white	Redfield Proctor
Edwin Clay Hayden	White	33	M	February 25, 1881	Orleans	Hanging	Murder	Gertrude White Hayden, 23, white (wife)	Roswell Farnham
Royal Carr	White		M	April 29, 1881	Washington	Hanging	Murder	William Wallace Marcommock, 35, Mixed (Note: Half white, half Native American.) (Note: Previously convicted of manslaughter for the rape and murder of Mary E. Loomis, a white woman, and served 10 years in prison. He had avoided a first degree murder conviction in that case on account of his intellectual disabilities.)	Roswell Farnham
Emeline Lucy Meaker	White	44	F	March 30, 1883	Washington	Hanging	Murder	Alice Meaker, 9, white (husband's half-sister)	John L. Barstow
Sylvester Henry Bell	White	58	M	January 1, 1892	Franklin	Hanging	Murder	Emma Bell, white (wife)	Carroll S. Page
Mary Rogers	White	22	F	December 8, 1905	Bennington	Hanging	Murder	Marcus Merritt Rogers, 32 (husband)	Charles J. Bell
Elroy Kent	White	33	M	July 5, 1912	Rutland	Hanging	Murder-Robbery	Delia Belle Congdon, 41, white	John A. Mead
Arthur Bosworth	White	28	M	January 2, 1914	Chittenden	Hanging	Murder	Mae Labelle, 19, white	Allen M. Fletcher
George Edward Warner	White	51	M	July 12, 1919	Windsor	Electrocution	Murder	Henry Filmore and Georgia Ann Wiggins, 66 and 61, white (father- and mother-in-law)	Percival W. Clement
Bert A. Stacey	White	54	M	July 7, 1932	Washington	Electrocution	Murder	Ruth May Stacey, 31, white (wife)	Stanley C. Wilson
Ronald Watson	White	21	M	January 2, 1947	Rutland	Electrocution	Murder-Robbery	Henry Charles Teelon, 45, white	Mortimer R. Proctor
Francis Herbert Blair	White	32	M	February 8, 1954	Windsor	Electrocution	Murder-Burglary	Elizabeth Chase Weatherup, 54, white (Note: Both men were escaped convicts from the Vermont State Prison, where DeMag was already serving a life sentence for the murder of 83-year-old Francis Racicot, white, in 1948.)	Lee E. Emerson
Donald Edward DeMag	White	31	M	December 8, 1954	Windsor	Electrocution	Murder-Burglary	Elizabeth Chase Weatherup, 54, white	Lee E. Emerson

== See also ==
- Capital punishment in Vermont
- Capital punishment in the United States
