= Norman Roye =

Executed American serial killer

- Roye after his arrest in 1954
- Born: September 6, 1935; New York, U.S.
- Died: January 19, 1956 (aged 20); Sing Sing Prison, New York, U.S.
- Other name: "The Dreaded Strangler"
- Status: Executed by electrocution
- Conviction: First degree murder
- Penalty: Death

Details
- Victims: 3
- Span of crimes: January – June 1954
- Country: United States
- State: New York
- Date apprehended: June 7, 1954

Norman Roye (September 6, 1935 – January 19, 1956), known as the Dreaded Strangler, was an American serial killer who raped and killed three women in the Upper Manhattan section of New York City over the winter and spring of 1954, primarily in the Harlem neighborhood. After his arrest, he was sentenced to death and eventually executed in the electric chair at Sing Sing in 1956.

== Early life ==
Roye was born on September 6, 1935. When he was eight years old, both of his parents died of unspecified causes; afterwards he and his sister were raised by his grandmother. Around his junior year of high school Roye began a habit of committing petty crimes, which eventually landed him in a state reformatory in November 1951. During his incarceration, he began to become interested in baseball, and after his release successfully made it into his school's baseball team. He even said he aspired to one day make it into the major leagues. Roye would state that around this time he began to commit purse snatches and thefts from parked trucks in New York City.

== Murders ==
On January 2, 1954, Roye was prowling through an apartment complex in Harlem when he began stalking Margaret Branch, 40, who was walking home alone. Roye waited until Branch was nearing her room when he attacked her. He choked and robbed her, then carried her to the fifth-floor and he raped her. Afterwards he strangled her to death with one of her Christmas stockings. Over four months later, on May 28, Roye found himself inside a subway station, when he began stalking 25-year-old Kathleen Stewart through the station all the way back to her Harlem river apartment. Once there, he confronted and threatened her, claiming he had a knife even though he did not. He forced her into the parking lot, raped her twice, then tied her hands behind her back and strangled her to death.

On June 7, 1954, Roye attacked 66-year-old Isadora Goomes as she entered her apartment building. Roye threw a noose around her neck and demanded money, and Goomes handed Roye five pennies, but not feeling satisfied Roye tightened the noose, resulting in Goomes dying of asphyxiation. With the five pennies Goomes had given him, Roye bought a box of crackers. He later ate the crackers while observing police examine Goomes' body. Detectives took notice of Roye spying on them and arrested him.

== Trial ==
Roye confessed to each of the murders, describing in detail how he had committed them. According to Roye's confession, he said he did not intend to kill Goomes, but claimed when he tightened the noose she, "just died on me."

Two days before Roye's arrest, a man named John Francis Roche was arrested after he was spotted driving erratically, and once in custody confessed to six murders which occurred in the Yorkvile neighborhood on Manhattan's east side. The two cases, which occurred in close proximity to one another, were compared to each other by the press and the media. In a jailhouse interview with his sister, Roye denied making a confession, stating, "they found my pants in the hallway." While awaiting trial, Roye was not eligible for bond. On February 4, 1955, Roye was convicted of first degree murder in the death of Goomes. The jury did not recommend mercy, making a death sentence mandatory. Roye was formally sentenced to death on March 5, 1955.

== Execution ==
While awaiting execution, Roye received no visitors, but turned to religion. After 10 months on death row, on January 19, 1956, Roye was executed by electric chair at Sing Sing Prison. His last meal consisted of roast chicken and steak. Roye had no last words.

== See also ==
- John Francis Roche
- List of people executed in New York
- List of serial killers in the United States
- List of people executed in the United States in 1956
