= Burton Abbott =

American criminal (1928–1957)

Burton W. Abbott
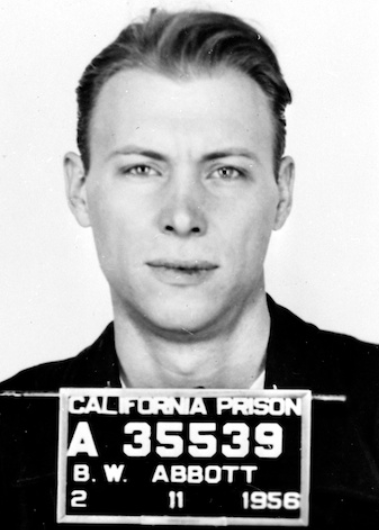
- Born: February 8, 1928; Portland, Oregon, U.S.
- Died: March 15, 1957 (aged 29); San Quentin State Prison, California, U.S.
- Occupation: Student
- Spouse: Georgia Abbott
- Children: 1
- Status: Executed by gas chamber
- Convictions: First degree murder Kidnapping with infliction of bodily harm
- Penalty: Death

Burton Wilbur Abbott (February 8, 1928 – March 15, 1957) was an American man who was convicted of the rape and murder of 14-year-old Stephanie Bryan in Berkeley, California.

Abbott's wife discovered evidence of Abbott’s crimes in their home's basement. Stephanie's body was found buried near the Abbott family's cabin. On January 25, 1956, he was sentenced to death in California's gas chamber. On March 15, 1957, a (second) one-hour stay of execution from the governor of California was communicated to the prison moments too late to halt his execution.

The case is sometimes cited when discussing the appropriateness of condemning a person based on circumstantial evidence alone. However, "most criminal convictions are based on circumstantial evidence, although it must be adequate to meet established standards of proof."

== Background ==
Burton Abbott, called Bud by his family, was the younger of two sons born to Harold Mark Abbott Sr. and Elsie Belle Moore. Abbott served in the U.S. Army for 14 months until he was honorably discharged after contracting tuberculosis and having half of a lung surgically removed. At the time of the crime, Abbott had been an accountant student at University of California at Berkeley since 1953.

== Murder ==
=== Disappearance ===
On April 28, 1955, Stephanie Bryan and Mary Anne Stewart walked home together from Willard Middle School. On Ashby Avenue, after visiting a donut shop and a pet store, Stewart parted ways with Bryan to attend tennis lessons. Bryan was last seen walking in direction of the parking lot of the Claremont Hotel to take a five-minute shortcut through a wooden path in the Berkeley Hills. She was reported missing shortly after 4:15 pm by her father, who had been alerted by his wife.

=== Investigation ===
A large-scale search organized the same day failed to find her. On May 1, one of Bryan's textbooks was found on Franklin Canyon Road near Martinez.

In mid-July, Georgia Abbott, Burton Abbott's wife, reported that she found a purse and ID card belonging to Stephanie Bryan in the basement of the Abbotts' home in Alameda. She had found the personal effects by chance while looking through boxes of clothing for a costume to wear at a party.

The home in Alameda was shared with her husband, their four-year-old son Christopher, and Burton's mother, Elsie Abbott.

The twenty acre mining claim property in Trinity County belonged to Georgia Abbott's father since 1941. The property was initially co-owned by a miner named Lloyd Snyder, but his share was shifted to Georgia's brother after Snyder was convicted for fatally shooting and dismembering a man during an argument in the cabin in 1950. As Snyder released on parole two months before Bryan's disappearance, he was briefly sought as a possible suspect, but eventually ruled out.

In interviewing the Abbotts, the police learned that Elsie Abbott had found the purse earlier, but said she did not connect it with the case. She would profess her son's innocence until she died and that he had been framed by her brother Wilbur Moore, a truck driver from San Leandro.

Police subsequently recovered Stephanie's glasses, a brassiere, and other evidence in the basement. No one in the family could account for how the victim's personal effects came to be there.

Burton Abbott told multiple, contradictory stories including that he had been at the family's cabin 285 miles away near Wildwood, Trinity County, California, when Stephanie disappeared. The owner of the inn where Abbott insisted he had been at the time of Bryan's disappearance said he was certain Abbott was not present and the babysitter who watched Abbott's house during his absence stated that Abbott had called her the same day and explicitly instructed her that his family could not join him at the cabin. A resident of Wildwood confirmed that Abbott was in town the day after Bryan's disappearance. Although the resident and Abbott were friends, he noted that Abbott behaved strangely and unlike the two prior days, he was refused entry to the cabin.

On July 20, 1955, the victim's body was found by San Francisco Examiner reporter Ed Montgomery and photographer Bob Bryant in a shallow grave a few hundred feet from the cabin, after they used a local's pet bloodhounds to scour the area. Bryan had died by blunt head trauma and had her underwear tied around her neck, with deep strangulation marks visible. Abbott's demeanor, previously calm and collected, reportedly shifted to anxious after the discovery. While crying, he told a reporter for The Examiner, "I don’t know how the body got there, I don’t know anything about it. I’m still staying with my story." Abbott's charges were updated to rape and murder.

== Trial ==
The trial began in November 1955 and was one of the most highly publicized in California history, receiving nearly daily coverage from newspapers across the state. Abbott's defense was headed by Stanley D. Whitney. Under Alameda County District Attorney J. Frank Coakley, the prosecution hypothesis was that Abbott had attempted to rape the victim and killed her when she resisted. 16 state witnesses placed Abbott at different locations near Bryan's usual school route between 3 p.m. and 4 p.m. Two of them, married couple Jackie and Allen Hill, also claimed that the day of Bryan's disappearance, shortly after 4 p.m., they had seen a car that had seemingly skidded off the road around the same area and seen the driver engaged in a physical struggle with a young girl, who wore clothing similar to Bryan. None of the witnesses could identify Abbott as the man they had seen with absolute certainty. Abbott pleaded not guilty.

He explained that in May, the basement of the house had been used as a polling site, with many people having access. Although the prosecution charged Abbott with rape, the pathologist testified that the body was too decomposed to evaluate it for evidence of sexual assault.

Abbott's attorney claimed that his client, who weighed 134 pounds and had several ribs removed due to tuberculosis, was too physically weak to have committed the murder and carried the victim's body to its burial site. The physician who performed surgery on Abbott for his TB, Elmer Shabert, contested that Abbott's recovery went well and that, just after Bryan's disappearance, his patient had abruptly resumed visitations to receive further treatment.

In December, Abbott took the stand and testified for four days. He spoke in a soft voice and was steadfast in his denials of any knowledge of the crime. He said it was all a "monstrous frame-up". The jury was out seven days before it returned a verdict of guilty for first degree murder and kidnapping with the infliction of bodily harm. The judge imposed two death sentences after the jury declined to recommend mercy on either count.

As provided by California law, there was an automatic appeal to the Supreme Court of California. In a detailed opinion describing the facts of the case and reciting the evidence that had been presented at trial, the court affirmed the conviction and the sentence of death.

== Execution ==
Abbott was incarcerated at San Quentin to await execution. His lawyers tried to appeal for over a year. Before his execution, Abbott spoke to the doctor at San Quentin. The doctor said that when he asked Abbott about the crime, he said, "I can't admit it, doc. Think of what it would do to my mother; she couldn't take it."

On March 15, 1957, the day of the execution which was scheduled for 10:00 am, Abbott's attorney George T. Davis appealed to the United States Court of Appeals and was denied. He then tried to contact the governor of California, Goodwin J. Knight, but the governor was on a naval ship, out at sea and out of reach of the telephone. The attorney arranged with a TV station to broadcast a plea to the governor.

At 9:02 Governor Knight, now reachable by telephone, granted a one-hour stay. Within six minutes a writ of habeas corpus was presented to the Supreme Court of California, but at 10:42 am the petition was denied. The attorney tried again with an appeal to the U.S. District Court, but that court refused a further postponement at 10:50 am.

At 11:12 am Governor Knight was reached again and agreed to another stay. At 11:14 am Abbott was led to the gas chamber and strapped into the chair while the governor's clemency secretary Joseph Babich was contacting the warden by telephone. The executioner pulled the lever three minutes later and 16 pellets of sodium cyanide dropped into a vat of sulfuric acid as Knight reached prison warden Harold O. Teets to stay the execution. Teets told him it was too late, and Abbott died as the governor hung up the telephone.

== See also ==
- List of people executed in California
- List of people executed in the United States in 1957
