= Tommy Lee Walker =

African-American man wrongfully convicted of murder (1934–1956)

- Born: December 21, 1934; Texas, U.S.
- Died: May 12, 1956 (aged 21); Huntsville Unit, Texas, U.S.
- Resting place: Lincoln Memorial Park, Dallas, Texas, U.S.
- Known for: Being controversially executed
- Children: 1
- Status: Executed by electrocution
- Conviction: Murder with malice
- Penalty: Death

Details
- Date apprehended: January 29, 1954

Tommy Lee Walker was an African-American man who was wrongfully convicted and executed by the state of Texas for the 1953 rape and murder of Venice Parker, a 31-year-old white woman from Dallas. Walker's conviction heavily relied upon a dubious confession he made to police under duress, which he later recanted. In January, 2026, nearly 70 years after his execution, Dallas County unanimously passed a resolution proclaiming that Walker had been wrongfully executed. The resolution is symbolic and not legally binding.

== Murder of Venice Parker ==
At approximately 9:00 PM on September 30, 1953, in Northwest Dallas, Texas, a passing driver returning home from work discovered 31-year-old store clerk Venice Lorraine Parker crawling in the middle of the road with a slashed throat and torn clothes. Parker told the man that she had been stabbed. The driver took Parker to his place of work at Dallas Love Field, where he called for an ambulance. Despite efforts by bystanders to save her life, Parker died before she could be brought to the hospital. An autopsy revealed that Parker had been raped before having her throat slit, with the cause of death being blood loss from a severed jugular vein. Investigators later found Parker's purse, underwear, and broken glasses at the bottom of a nearby ravine.

A police officer present when Parker died later claimed that Parker had told him, "A Negro took me under the bridge and cut my throat." At the time, rumors of a "Negro Prowler" stalking white women in the area had led to increased racial tensions in Dallas. Police detained dozens of black men for questioning during the course of their investigation.

== Arrest ==
In January 1954, a service station where Walker had previously worked was robbed, and police investigating the robbery obtained Walker's name from a list of former employees. The 19-year-old Walker was arrested at his home in Bryan Place, Dallas on January 29 and brought in for questioning. While being held at Dallas Police Headquarters, Walker reportedly saw two white jail officers beating another black inmate.

The following night, on January 30, Walker was subjected to interrogation by Dallas Police Captain Will Fritz, who falsely told Walker that the Dallas Police had received a call implicating him in Venice Parker's murder, and that witnesses could place him at the crime scene. Walker later claimed that Fritz had threatened to "bring in the men from upstairs" if he did not confess, which Walker took to be a reference to the beating of the black inmate he had witnessed earlier.

After several hours of questioning, Walker signed a confession to the murder which included numerous details that did not align with the evidence, including a denial of ever raping the victim and claiming she had "fallen" on the knife rather than having her throat slit. No physical evidence linked Walker to the crime, and Walker later claimed to have never read the confession he signed until it was introduced at trial.

Several days later, when meeting with Dallas County District Attorney Henry Wade, Walker recanted his confession and provided an alibi for the night of the murder, claiming he had been driven to Baylor Hospital three hours before the time of the murder to tend to his underaged girlfriend, who was giving birth to their son. Nevertheless, on February 9, 1954, a Dallas grand jury returned an indictment charging Walker with murder with malice.

Walker's underaged girlfriend, 14-year-old Mary Louise Smith, told the police that he was with her on the night of the murder since she was giving birth. Walker had impregnated Mary when he was 18 and she was 13. Under state law, this would've made Walker guilty of statutory rape, then a capital offense under state law. Texas law defined statutory rape as a man having sex with a female under the age of fifteen years and not his wife.

== Trial and execution ==
Walker's trial began in March 1954, in Dallas County, with District Attorney Wade personally prosecuting the case. An internal memo later revealed that Wade had instructed prosecutors to strike "Jews, Negroes, Dagos, Mexicans or a member of any minority race" from the jury pool. In addition to using Walker's recanted confession as evidence, the state called two witnesses who claimed to have seen a black man fitting Walker's description walking on the road near the crime scene on the night of the murder. Nine eyewitnesses who corroborated Walker's alibi testified during the defense's portion of the trial. Amongst those witnesses were Mary Louise Smith, Mary's mother, and Walker's sister. Wade attacked discrepancies in their testimony, stating that Mary had previously told the police that Walker wasn't there. It is unclear if the illegal nature of the relationship between Walker and Mary was used against him.

Walker himself also testified on his own behalf during his trial and claimed that he had been coerced into making a false confession under threat of bodily harm.

On March 29, 1954, after deliberating for under two hours, the all-white jury convicted Walker of murder with malice and sentenced him to death. When interviewed while awaiting execution, Walker continued to maintain his innocence.

On January 25, 1956, Walker appeared again in Dallas County Court, where Judge Henry King set his execution date and read him his death warrant. When given the chance to speak, Walker maintained his innocence and told the court "I feel that I have been tricked out of my life."

Shortly after midnight on May 12, 1956, Walker was executed in the electric chair at the Huntsville Unit in Huntsville, Texas. As he was strapped in the chair, Walker told the witnesses, "I'm innocent." He was pronounced dead at 12:06 AM, and buried at Lincoln Memorial Park in Dallas.

== Exoneration ==
Tommy Lee Walker was the subject of a 2016 article by journalist Mary Mapes in D Magazine, which called into question the veracity of his conviction and brought renewed attention to his case. Dallas County District Attorney John Creuzot ordered a review of the Walker case with the help of the Innocence Project, which concluded that Walker had been innocent. On January 21, 2026, Dallas County commissioners unanimously passed a symbolic resolution declaring that Walker had been wrongfully convicted and executed. The sons of both Walker and Venice Parker were present at the meeting.

== See also ==
- Capital punishment in Texas
- List of people executed in Texas
- List of wrongful convictions in the United States
- False confession
