= Riverview Cemetery =

Riverview Cemetery can refer to:

in the United States

(sorted by state)

- Riverview Cemetery (Wilmington, Delaware), listed on the National Register of Historic Places (NRHP) in New Castle County
- Riverview Cemetery, Ogle County, Illinois
- Riverview Cemetery (McCone County, Montana)
- Riverview Cemetery (Hamilton, Montana) in Hamilton, Montana
- Riverview Cemetery (Richland County, Montana)
- Riverview Cemetery (Roosevelt County, Montana)
- Riverview Cemetery (Trenton, New Jersey), listed on the NRHP in Mercer County
- River View Cemetery (Portland, Oregon)
- Riverview Cemetery, Charlottesville, Virginia
