= Capital punishment in Vermont =

Capital punishment in the state of Vermont effectively ended in 1972 for all crimes due to Furman v. Georgia. Unlike most other states, Vermont did not reinstate the death penalty. The state last executed a prisoner, Donald DeMag, in 1954, after he received the sentence for a robbery-murder he committed after escaping prison, where he was serving a life sentence for another murder. In 1965, Vermont abolished capital punishment for all crimes except the murder of a police officer or the murder of a prison guard. This statute was rendered moot in 1972 and abolished in 1987.

Although DeMag was the last person executed by Vermont, he was not the last person to be sentenced to death by a Vermont court. Lionel Goyet, a soldier who was Absent Without Leave for the fifth time, robbed and killed a farmhand, and was sentenced to death in 1957. His sentence was commuted six months later, and Goyet was conditionally pardoned in 1969. He had no further problems with the law, and died of heart failure in 1980.

Vermont had a pre-Furman statute providing death by electrocution for treason until the punishment was replaced in 2024 by imprisonment and potentially an additional fine.

Vermont was also the first U.S. state to move its executions into its state prison, doing so in 1864.

== Summary ==
Vermont capital punishment summary Total number of executions: 26 (25 as a state)
	Date	Method	Name	Offense
Date capital punishment was legally abolished	1972			
Legal methods of execution	1778–1919	hanging (21)		
Legal methods of execution	1919–1965	electrocution (5)		
First legal execution	06-11-1778	hanging	David Redding	treason
Most recent legal execution	12-08-1954	electrocution	Donald DeMag	murder

== See also ==
- List of people executed in Vermont
- Crime in Vermont
- Law of Vermont
