= Consuelo Clark-Stewart =

American physician

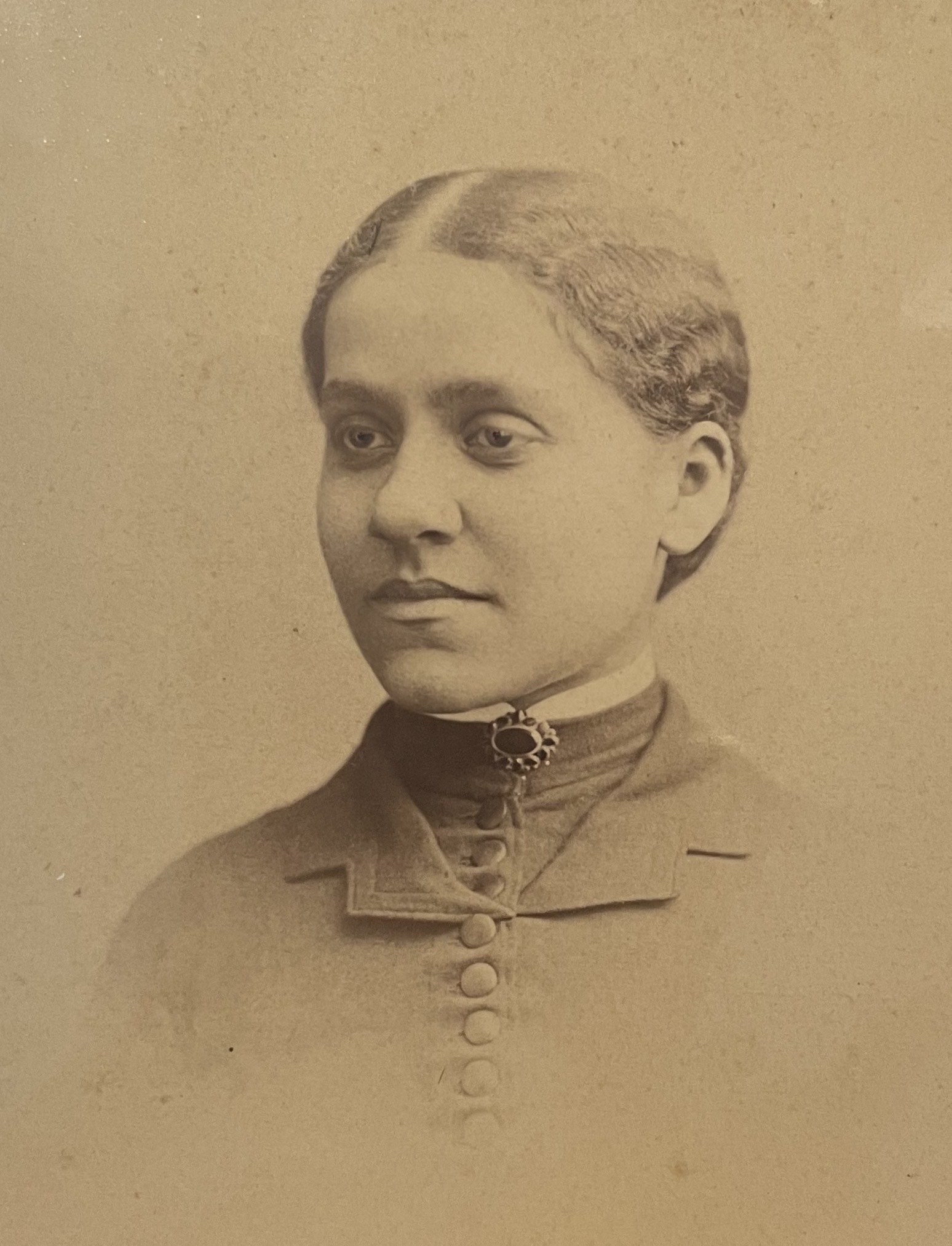
- Consuelo Clark-Stewart as a medical student in Boston.
- Born: 1861; Ohio
- Died: April 17, 1910 (aged 48–49)
- Education: Boston University School of Medicine
- Occupation: physician
- Known for: The first African American woman to practice medicine in Ohio
- Spouse: William R. Stewart (married 1890)
- Father: Peter H. Clark

Consuelo Clark-Stewart (July 22, 1860 – April 17, 1910) was an American physician and the first African American woman to practice medicine in Ohio.

For twenty years, Clark-Stewart ran a thriving medical practice in Youngstown, Ohio, where she treated both black and white patients. She was the daughter of Peter H. Clark, who is considered the first Black socialist, and the wife of William R. Stewart, one of the first Black attorneys and elected representatives in Ohio. Her father and husband often overshadowed her accomplishments because of their own successes.

== Early life ==
Clark was born in Ohio in 1861, one of three children of abolitionist Peter H. Clark and Frances Ann Williams Clark. Her parents struggled financially, which caused them to move to eight different homes between 1858 and 1869. She graduated from Gaines High School in Cincinnati in 1879.

== Career ==
After graduating from high school, Clark studied medicine privately with Dr. Elmira Y. Howard, the first woman physician in Cincinnati. While she studied with Dr. Howard, she was studying art at the McMicken School of the Arts. Clark later realized that her true calling was medicine and obtained a place at Boston University School of Medicine, graduating in 1884 after earning the highest honors on her final exams. During her three-year study, she was the only black student in her class. Clark was not only breaking barriers for women in medicine but also for black representation in medicine. After graduation, she returned to Ohio and worked at the Ohio Hospital for Women and Children.

In 1890, Clark married attorney William R. Stewart. Thereafter, she referred to herself as Dr. Consuelo Clark-Stewart. She moved with her husband to Youngstown, Ohio, where set up a private practice in medicine and treated both black and white patients. She did not discriminate anyone and that was why she became well-known in Ohio. Her reputation as a good doctor allowed her to break all kinds of barriers both within her career and her racial class. She was the first African American woman to practice medicine in Ohio which inspired and gave hope to women and African Americans.

In Youngstown, Clark-Stewart was active in the YWCA and in setting up free kindergartens.

== Death ==
In 1907, Clark-Stewart's husband admitted her into the Ohio State Hospital for the Insane at Massillon, where she was declared insane. Her diagnosis was based on the accusations she made of her husband being abusive toward her. Her sister, Ernestine Clark Nesbitt, made the trip to Youngstown and spent two weeks gathering statements from doctors who declared Clark-Stewart sane. These statements allowed for the discharge of Clark-Stewart, and newspapers reported that she was living with her sister in 1908. However, the details of her release are not clear because the census in 1910 reported that she was still a patient at the mental health hospital, but she had died two weeks before the census took place. Clark-Stewart died of Pernicious anemia on April 17, 1910, at the Youngstown City Hospital.
