= William R. Stewart =

American politician

- Born: October 29, 1864; New Castle, Pennsylvania, US
- Died: April 5, 1958 (aged 93); Youngstown, Ohio, US
- Occupation: Lawmaker

William R. Stewart (October 29, 1864 – April 5, 1958) was an African American lawyer and state legislator in Ohio. He served in the Ohio House of Representatives. An African-American, he was instrumental in the passage of anti-lynching legislation and also sponsored bills providing pensions to civil servants. He was the first African American to practice law in Youngstown, Ohio.

During his two terms as a lawmaker and almost seven decades as a private attorney, Stewart participated in projects and policies designed to improve the condition of African Americans. Toward the end of his life, he was publicly honored for his role in promoting interracial cooperation.

Stewart retained his law practice until failing health and advanced age intervened. At the time of his death, he was one of the most prominent figures in Youngstown's legal community.

== Early years ==
Stewart was born in New Castle, Pennsylvania, the son of Lemuel A. Stewart, a bricklayer. The family moved to Youngstown when Stewart was still a young child. Despite the elder Stewart's expressed desire that his son follow in his trade, William Stewart pursued his studies at Youngstown's Rayen School, where he earned a diploma in 1883.

After graduating from high school, Stewart became a baggage master with the old P.C. & P. Railroad. He went on to read law in the Cincinnati office of Laurin D. Woodworth, a two-term congressman, and Benjamin Franklin Wirt, a former state senator. During this time, Stewart developed a brisk sideline helping Civil War veterans cut through government red tape to secure their pensions.

== Legal career ==
Upon the sale of his practice, Stewart acquired enough money to enter Cincinnati Law School, where he graduated in 1886. He returned to Youngstown and established law offices in a downtown landmark known as "the old Diamond block". In 1895, he was nominated for state representative at the Mahoning County Republican convention. On October 14, 1895, an editorial in The Youngstown Telegram accused Stewart's Democratic opponent, James B. Chambers, of employing racist rhetoric in his campaign. "This argument is not in good taste for the reason that we are not living in the far South where the colored man is not allowed by Democrats to exercise the rights of a free American citizen", the editorial stated. "We are in the North, where all men are equal". The editorial outlined Stewart's qualifications for public office and indicated he had "won the esteem and good wishes of everyone who knows him". At the close of the election, Stewart defeated Chambers by a margin of more than 900 votes.

Mark Hanna, whom Stewart supported for election to the U.S. Senate

In 1897, Stewart was unanimously nominated for re-election at his party's convention. At a time when U.S. senators were elected by state lawmakers, Stewart publicly vowed to support the senatorial bid of Cleveland political boss Mark Hanna, who managed the successful presidential campaign of William McKinley in 1896. His Democratic opponent, Mark R. Morris, promised to vote against Hanna. Ultimately, Stewart prevailed over Morris by a vote of 6,075 to 5,749.

During his two terms as a state lawmaker, Stewart sponsored legislation that provided pensions to police and firemen, ensured tax support for the establishment of St. Elizabeth's Hospital, and initiated legislation for the construction of Youngstown's Market Street Bridge, which opened up a vibrant business district to the south of the city. In addition, he supported the Smith Anti-Mob Violence bill, which featured stronger measures to prevent vigilante justice. In 1897, during his campaign for a second term in the state legislature, Stewart hosted the convention of the National League of Colored Voters of Pennsylvania, Ohio, New York, and West Virginia, which was held in Youngstown that year.

Stewart chose not to seek a third term in the Ohio Senate, stating that his responsibilities as a lawmaker interfered with his law practice. After an unsuccessful bid for probate judge, he abandoned politics altogether. From 1907 to 1914, Stewart served as the local attorney for the Austria-Hungarian monarchy, representing the Washington embassy through the Cleveland consulate.

== Personal life ==
In 1890, Stewart married Consuelo Clark, a licensed physician who was the daughter of Peter H. Clark, a civil rights leader and educator. When the couple settled in Youngstown, Consuelo Clark-Stewart became the community's first African-American doctor. In addition, she helped organize a local chapter of the YWCA and sponsored Youngstown's first free kindergarten. Consuelo Stewart died in 1910; William Stewart never remarried.

== Later years ==
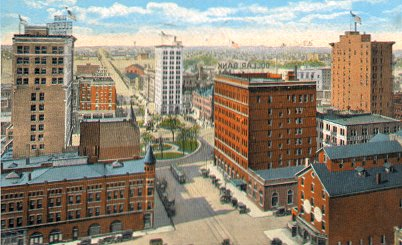
Youngstown, Ohio

In 1924, after almost 40 years in the same location, Stewart moved his offices to another downtown building to make way for the razing of the "old Diamond block". He maintained a downtown law practice until well into his eighties, when a broken hip severely limited his mobility. Stewart, in retirement, remained a visible figure within his community. In 1947, he was publicly honored as the first person to organize a local committee dedicated to interracial work. Stewart died at his North Side home of arteriosclerosis at the age of 93. His obituary in The Youngstown Vindicator described him as "the dean of Youngstown's attorneys".
