= Caroline Augusta Lord =

American painter

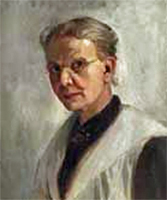
- Self Portrait
- Born: 1860; Cincinnati, Ohio
- Died: 1927 (aged 66–67); Cincinnati, Ohio
- Known for: Painting, Educator

Caroline Augusta Lord (1860–1927) was an American painter who taught at the Art Academy of Cincinnati for decades.

== Biography ==
Lord was born in 1860 in Cincinnati. Beginning in 1884 she attended the Art Academy of Cincinnati where she studied with Thomas Satterwhite Noble and Lewis C. Lutz. She traveled to Paris in 1890 to study with Jean-Paul Laurens and Jean-Joseph Benjamin-Constant at the Académie Julian. While studying in Paris Lord became acquainted with fellow painter Elizabeth Nourse. In 1892 Lord moved to New York where she studied with Kenyon Cox at the Art Students League of New York.

From 1892 through 1895 she exhibited at the Paris Salon. She exhibited her work in the Cincinnati Room of the Woman's Building at the 1893 World's Columbian Exposition in Chicago, Illinois.

Lord was a member of the Society of Western Artists and the Cincinnati Women's Art Club. She taught at the Art Academy of Cincinnati for thirty-four years.

Lord died in 1927 in Cincinnati.

== Acme Laundry in Cincinnati ==
Series of three paintings depicting women employees at the Acme Laundry located at 911 Vine Street in Cincinnati, painted by Lord in 1911.

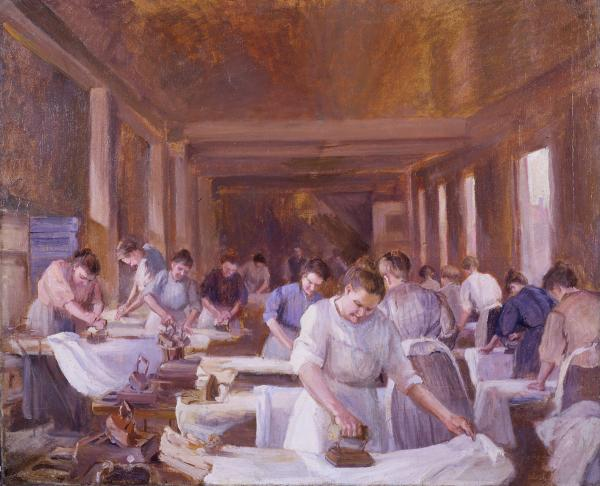

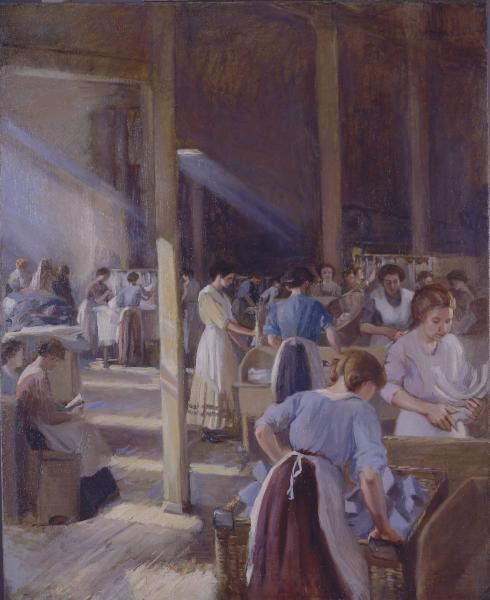

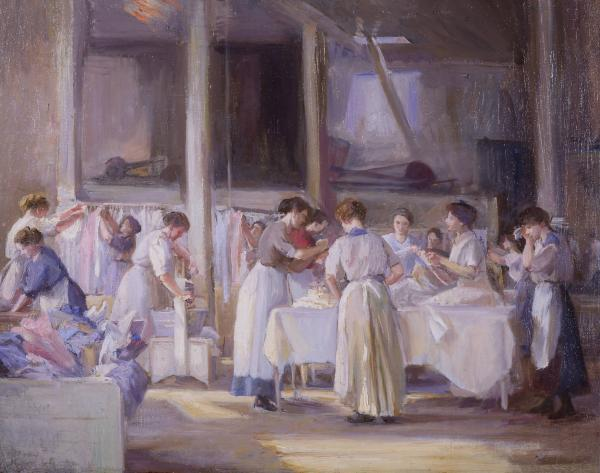
