= Elizabeth Coffin =

American painter

Elizabeth Rebecca Coffin
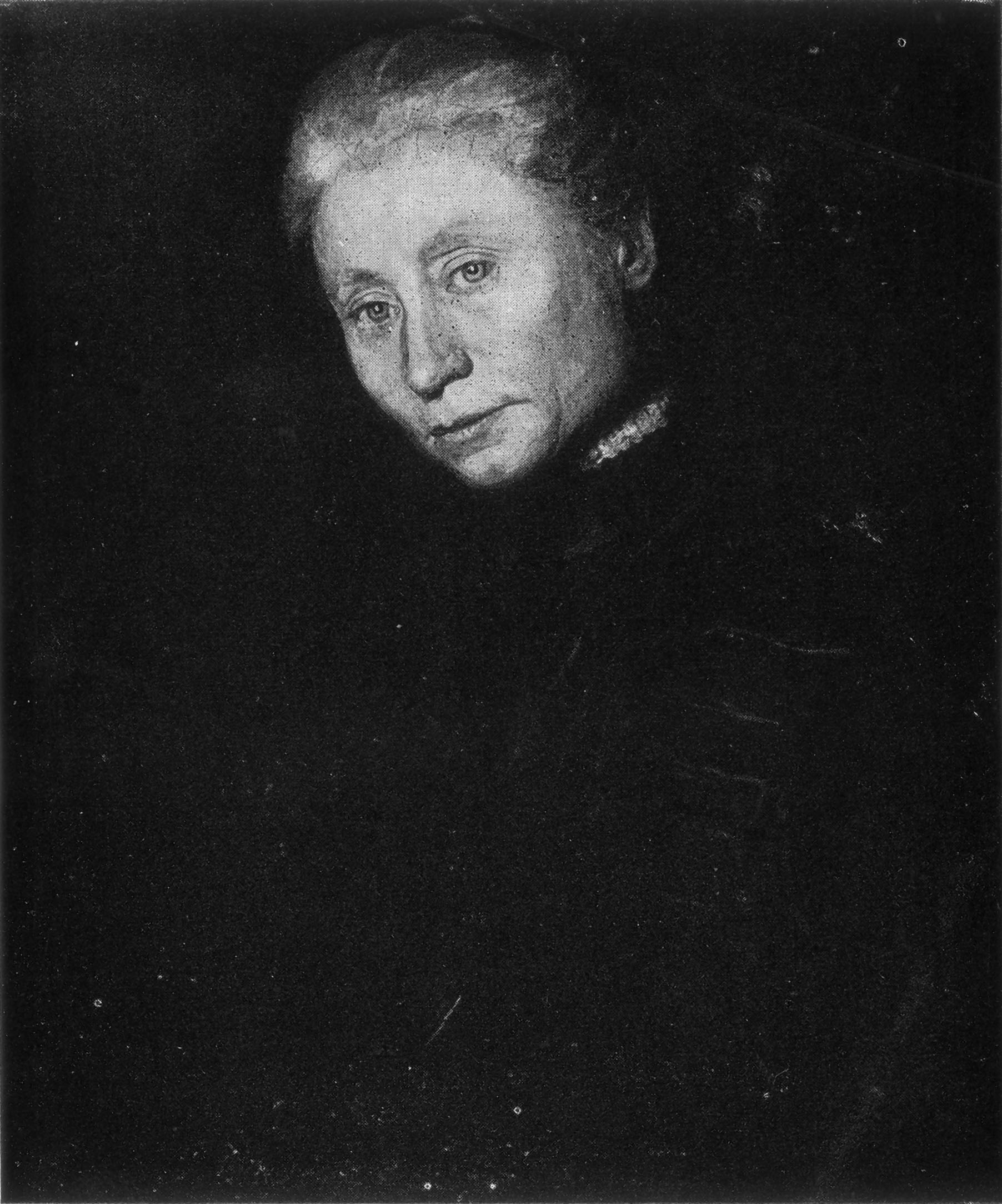
- Thomas Eakins, Portrait of Elizabeth Coffin
- Born: Elizabeth Rebecca Coffin; September 9, 1850; Brooklyn, New York
- Died: June 21, 1930 (aged 79); Nantucket, Massachusetts
- Resting place: Friends Cemetery, Prospect Park, Brooklyn, New York
- Education: Vassar College (AB, MFA), Hague Academy of Fine Arts, Pennsylvania Academy of Fine Arts, Art Students League of New York
- Known for: Painting
- Notable work: Nantucket scenes
- Awards: Several Hague medals, Norman W. Dodge, National Academy of Design (1892, 1902)

Elizabeth Rebecca Coffin (1850–1930) was an American artist, educator and philanthropist who is known for her paintings of Nantucket, Massachusetts. Well-educated and accomplished, she was one of the "New Women" of the 19th century who explored opportunities not traditionally available to women. She was the first person in the United States to earn a Master of Fine Arts degree and was the first woman admitted to the Hague Academy of Fine Arts. She opened a school in Nantucket that had been only open to men and offered several types of trade and crafts work courses to both genders.

== Early life ==
Elizabeth Rebecca Coffin, nicknamed "Lizzie", was born September 9, 1850, in Brooklyn, New York, into a Quaker family. She was the daughter of Andrew G. Coffin and Elizabeth M. Sherwood Coffin. Her father was born on Nantucket, Massachusetts and her mother in New York City.

She was an eighth-generation descendant of the original Nantucket settlers Tristram and Dionis Coffin.

== Education ==
She studied at the Friends Seminary in New York City before attending Vassar College, where she was taught by the Dutch painter Henry Van Ingen. She received her Bachelor of Arts degree there in 1870. In 1872 she enrolled at the Hague Academy of Fine Arts, the first woman to gain admission to this school. Coffin studied at the Hague Academy for three years and received medals for anatomy, composition, perspective and antique drawing. She received her Master of Fine Arts degree from Vassar College in 1876; Coffin was the first person in the United States to have received that degree. Maria Mitchell, a professor of astronomy at Vassar, was Coffin's mentor and lifelong friend.

She later studied at the Art Students League of New York, and the Pennsylvania Academy of the Fine Arts. She also traveled extensively in Europe and California. Coffin was a pupil of Thomas Eakins.

== Career ==
=== Art ===
Coffin began to summer regularly on Nantucket, starting in the 1880s, and moved there in 1900. She painted in the American Realist style. Her paintings preserved the way of life of Nantucket, now no longer a whaling port. Her Hanging the Nets was exhibited in 1892 at the National Academy of Design and won the Norman W. Dodge Prize for the best picture by a woman. She won the Norman W. Dodge Prize at the National Academy again in 1902. She exhibited her work at the Palace of Fine Arts at the 1893 World's Columbian Exposition in Chicago, Illinois.

She was one of the "New Woman" of the 19th century successful, highly trained women artists who did not marry, like Ellen Day Hale, Mary Cassatt, Elizabeth Nourse and Cecilia Beaux. About 1890 Coffin made a self-portrait. Along with Hale and Nourse, these women "created compelling self-portraits in which they fearlessly presented themselves as individuals willing to flout social codes and challenge accepted ideas regarding women's place in society. Indeed, the New Women portraits of the 1880s and 1890s are unforgettable interpretations of energetic, self-confident and accomplished women."

Coffin was a member of the Brooklyn Art Guild and the Art Students League of New York. Her art work has been in the collections of the Vassar College Art Gallery, Frances Lehman Loeb collection, Nantucket Historical Association and The Coffin School.

=== Educator ===
In her later years she put most of her energy into reviving handicraft instruction at the Greek Revival Coffin School. It was built in 1852 for nautical and private education of boys and for descendants of town founder Tristram Coffin by Admiral Sir Isaac Coffin. The school closed in 1898 and Elizabeth Coffin reopened the school for students of both genders in 1903. It taught males woodworking, mechanical drawing, plumbing and metalworking; Females were taught basketry, cooking, and sewing. Until Coffin taught basketmaking, baskets were traditionally made by boys and retired sea-faring men on Nantucket. Her students included women from the Goldenrod Literary and Debating Society which was established in 1895 for girls. Coffin reopened the school during a period when the whaling industry, which had been the economic backbone of the island, had ended. The trades helped to create new opportunities for men and women. Coffin School has Elizabeth Coffin's paintings on display.

== Personal life ==
In 1910 Coffin was living at 30 Remsen Street in Brooklyn, New York. She left for Europe, intending to spend two years there. In 1927 she sailed from Southampton, England to New York on the SS Nieuw Amsterdam with Fred Coffin, who was born in 1873 and lived at 30 Remsen Street in Brooklyn. Her address was the Vassar Club on 57th Street in New York City. On Nantucket, she lived at 23 Lily Street. Her recreational interests included sailing, walking and driving. She was also interested in the theatre, opera and music.

During her life, she worked with boys and girls clubs, including supporting a gymnasium at the Nantucket Athletic Club for children; settlement houses; and the women's suffrage movement. Coffin was a member of the Association of Collegiate Alumni, Vassar Alumni Association and Vassar Student's Aid Association. She was active with the National Child Labor Committee, College Settlements Association, Maria L. Owen Society for the Preservation of Wild Flowers, Nantucket Historical Association and Nantucket Civil League. Coffin was living in her home on Lily Street in Nantucket when she died on June 21, 1930. She was buried in Brooklyn, New York at the Friends Cemetery at Prospect Park.

In the death of Elizabeth R. Coffin on June 21, the class of 1870 has lost not only one of its best loved members but also a woman who, like her class-mate Ellen Swallow Richards, made a distinguished contribution to American life.

— 1870 Class Correspondent Mary A. Mineah, Vassar Quarterly, November 1930

== Legacy ==
A retrospective of her work was held at Vassar in 1920 during her 50th class reunion; Taylor Hall exhibited more than 70 of her works. In 2007, The Nantucket Historical Association exhibited Coffin's paintings and loaned a painting for an exhibition entitled "Gutsy Gals: From Hearth to Heavens, Maria Mitchell and Her Sister Nantucketers" by the Egan Maritime Foundation and The Coffin School. The exhibition discusses:

...the various elements that encouraged and supported the independence and work of women on Nantucket using Maria Mitchell and other island women of her time and today as examples. Whaling, the isolation of the island, and Quakerism all played roles in providing a unique environment in which Nantucket women had freedoms which their counterparts in the rest of America and the world did not during the nineteenth and twentieth centuries. These strong, independent Nantucket women not only contributed to the community of Nantucket, but also to the national and global communities.

Coffin and one of her paintings were mentioned in Beachcombers: A Novel by Nancy Thayer.

== Gallery ==
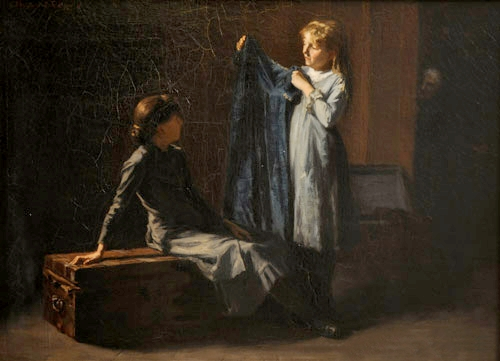
Elizabeth Coffin,
Grandmother's Garret,
1884,
Nantucket Historical Association

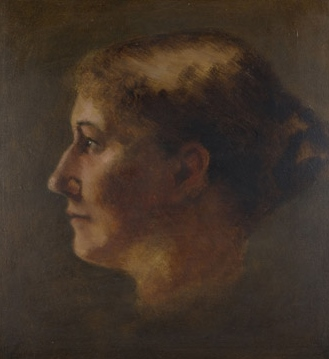
Elizabeth Coffin,
Small Head in Profile (Portrait of Mary Eliza Starbuck),
c. 1890,
Nantucket Historical Association

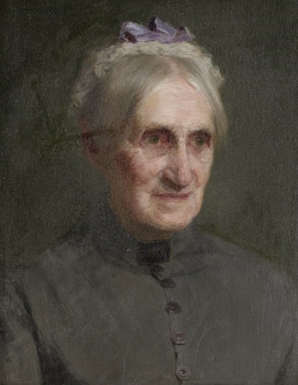
Elizabeth Coffin,
Old Age Portrait of Anna G. Chase Derrick,
1892,
Nantucket Historical Association

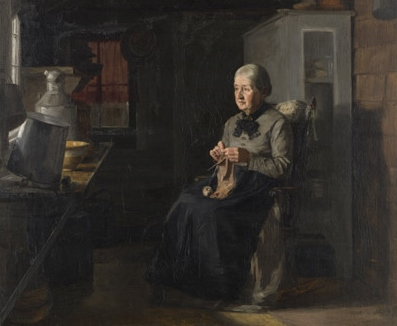
Elizabeth Coffin,
The Window Towards the Sea: Phebe Folger Pitman,
c. 1886-1887,
Nantucket Historical Association

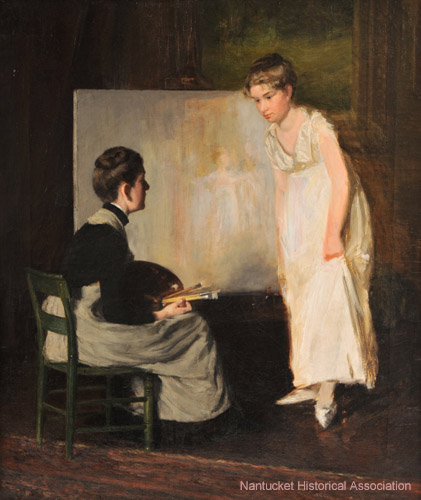
Elizabeth Coffin,
Portrait of the Artist in Conversation with Subject (unfinished),
c. 1890,
Nantucket Historical Association

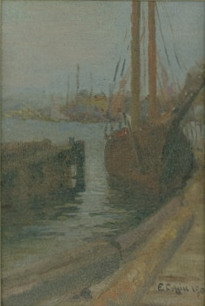
Elizabeth Coffin,
Fishing Boat in Nantucket Harbor,
1906,
Nantucket Historical Association
