= William Parham =

American politician

William Hartwell Parham (September 15, 1841 - July 9, 1904) was an American teacher, principal, lawyer, and Ohio state legislator.

== Early life and personal life ==
Parham was born September 15, 1841, in Petersburg, Virginia, spent his childhood in Philadelphia before moving to Cincinnati, Ohio, at the age of 16. He married Mary A. Crogan. He was an Odd Fellow and a Mason and belonged to the Baptist Church. He wrote An Official History of the Most Worshipful Grand Lodge Free and Accepted Masons for the State of Ohio, it was published posthumously in 1906.

== Career ==
Parham was the superintendent of "colored" high schools from 1866 to 1876. When the "colored School Board" was abolished he was made principal of all the schools, and then served as principal of Gaines High School from 1887.

He resigned from his position as principal in 1890 and changed careers from education to law, becoming the first African American to graduate from Cincinnati Law School. He was also the first African American to become an Ohio state notary.

He was the first African American to be nominated for office in Ohio's legislature, at first refusing the nomination but later accepting. He represented Hamilton County, Ohio, in the Ohio House of Representatives in 1896 and 1897 as a Republican.

Along with other prominent Masons he publicly raised their dissatisfaction with President William McKinley's silence on lynchings and refusal to commission black officers in the army.

== Death ==
He died July 9, 1904, at his home at 1240 Chapel street, Walnut Hills, Cincinnati. His death was due to paralysis after having multiple strokes starting the first of June.
