= Cecilia Beaux =

American painter (1855–1942)

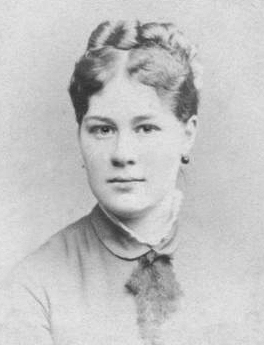
- Beaux, c. 1888
- Born: Eliza Cecilia Beaux; May 1, 1855; Philadelphia, Pennsylvania, U.S.
- Died: September 17, 1942 (aged 87); Gloucester, Massachusetts, U.S.
- Resting place: West Laurel Hill Cemetery, Bala Cynwyd, Pennsylvania, U.S.
- Education: Francis Adolf Van der Wielen, Académie Julian, Académie Colarossi
- Known for: Portrait painting
- Movement: Impressionism
- Awards: Mary Smith Prize, PAFA (1885, 1887, 1891, 1892); First Prize, Carnegie Institute (1899); Temple Gold Medal, PAFA (1900); Gold Medal, Exposition Universelle (1900)

Eliza Cecilia Beaux (May 1, 1855 – September 17, 1942) was an American artist and the first woman to teach art at the Pennsylvania Academy of the Fine Arts. Known for her elegant and sensitive portraits of friends, relatives, and Gilded Age patrons, Beaux painted many famous subjects including First Lady Edith Roosevelt, Admiral Sir David Beatty and Georges Clemenceau.

Beaux was trained in Philadelphia and went on to study in Paris where she was influenced by academic artists Tony Robert-Fleury and William-Adolphe Bouguereau as well as the work of Édouard Manet and Edgar Degas. Her style was compared to that of John Singer Sargent; at one exhibition, Bernard Berenson joked that her paintings were the best Sargents in the room. Like her instructor William Sartain, she believed there was a connection between physical characteristics and behavioral traits.

Beaux was awarded a gold medal for lifetime achievement by the National Institute of Arts and Letters, and honored by Eleanor Roosevelt as "the American woman who had made the greatest contribution to the culture of the world".

== Early life and education ==
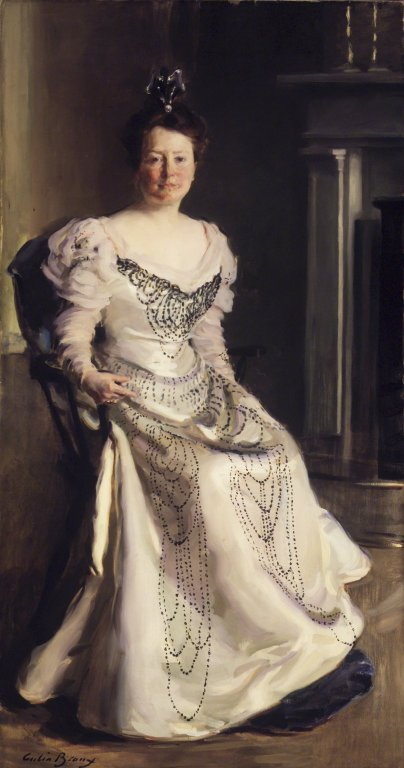
Mrs. Robert Abbe (Catherine Amory Bennett), 1888–89, now on display at the Brooklyn Museum

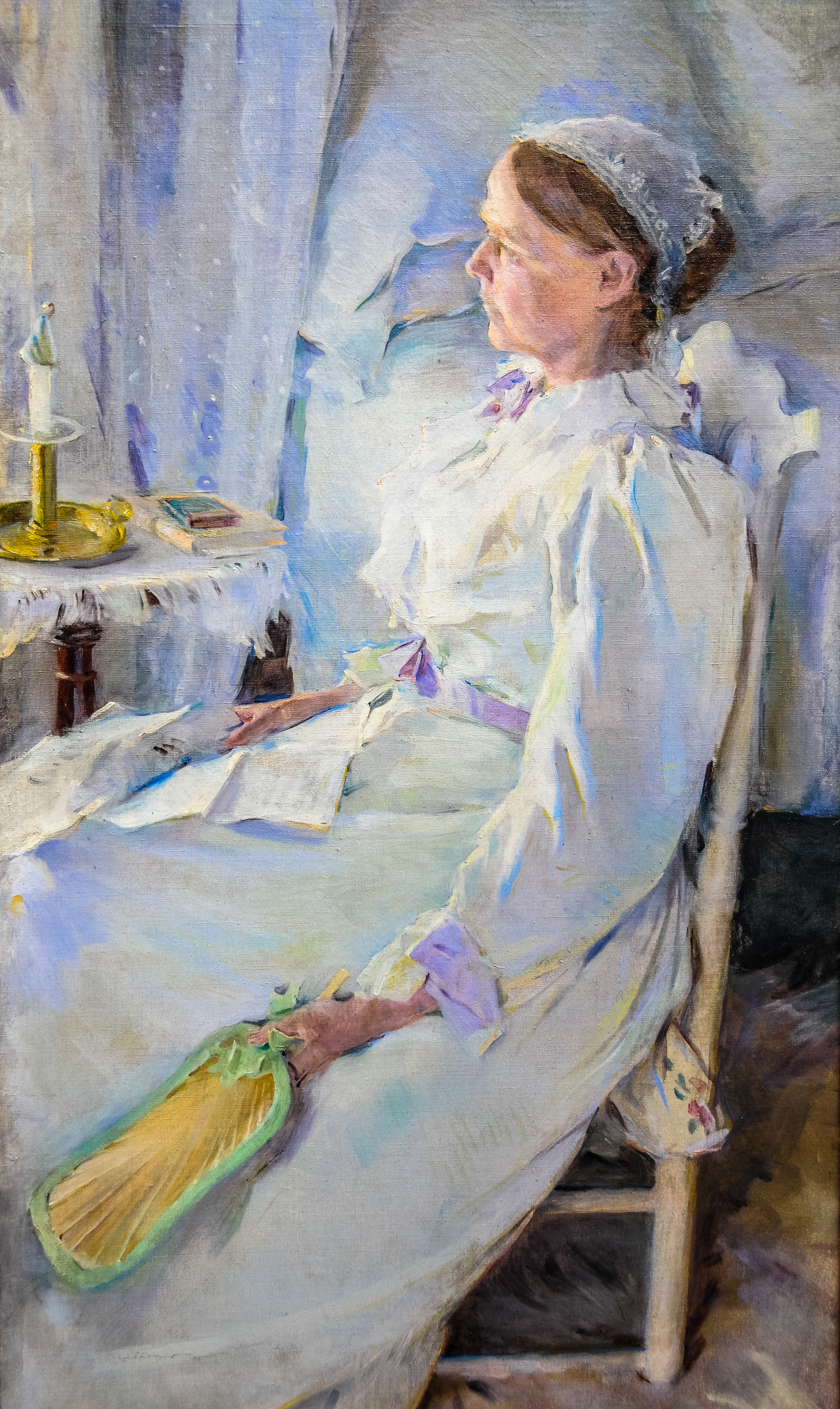
New England Woman. Portrait of Mrs. Jedidiah H. Richards (Beaux's cousin Julia Leavitt), 1895, now on display at the Pennsylvania Academy of the Fine Arts in Philadelphia

Beaux was born on May 1, 1855, in Philadelphia, the younger daughter of French silk manufacturer Jean Adolphe Beaux and teacher Cecilia Kent Leavitt. Her mother was the daughter of prominent businessman John Wheeler Leavitt of New York City and his wife, Cecilia Kent of Suffield, Connecticut. Cecilia Kent Leavitt died from puerperal fever 12 days after giving birth at age 33.

Cecilia and her sister Etta were subsequently raised by their maternal grandmother and aunts, primarily in Philadelphia. Her father, unable to bear the grief of his loss, and feeling adrift in a foreign country, returned to his native France for 16 years, with only one visit back to Philadelphia. He returned when Cecilia was two, but left four years later after his business failed. As she confessed later, "We didn't love Papa very much, he was so foreign. We thought him peculiar." Her father did have a natural aptitude for drawing and the sisters were charmed by his whimsical sketches of animals. Later, Beaux would discover that her French heritage would serve her well during her pilgrimage and training in France.

In Philadelphia, Beaux's aunt Emily married mining engineer William Foster Biddle, whom Beaux would later describe as "after my grandmother, the strongest and most beneficent influence in my life." For fifty years, he cared for his nieces-in-law with consistent attention and occasional financial support. Her grandmother, on the other hand, provided day-to-day supervision and kindly discipline. Whether with housework, handiwork, or academics, Grandma Leavitt offered a pragmatic framework, stressing that "everything undertaken must be completed, conquered." The Civil War years were particularly challenging, but the extended family survived despite little emotional or financial support from Beaux's father.

After the war, Beaux began to spend some time in the household of "Willie" and Emily, both proficient musicians. Beaux learned to play the piano but preferred singing. The musical atmosphere later proved an advantage for her artistic ambitions. Beaux recalled, "They understood perfectly the spirit and necessities of an artist's life." In her early teens, she had her first major exposure to art during visits with Willie to the nearby Pennsylvania Academy of the Fine Arts, one of America's foremost art schools and museums. Though fascinated by the narrative elements of some of the pictures, particularly the Biblical themes of the massive paintings of Benjamin West, at this point Beaux had no aspirations of becoming an artist.

Her childhood was a sheltered though generally happy one. As a teen she already manifested the traits, as she described, of "both a realist and a perfectionist, pursued by an uncompromising passion for carrying through." She attended the Misses Lyman School and was just an average student, though she did well in French and Natural History. However, she was unable to afford the extra fee for art lessons.

At age 16, Beaux began art lessons with a relative, Catherine Ann Drinker, an accomplished artist who had her own studio and a growing clientele. Drinker became Beaux's role model, and she continued lessons with Drinker for a year. She then studied for two years with the painter Francis Adolf Van der Wielen, who offered lessons in perspective and drawing from casts during the time that the new Pennsylvania Academy of the Fine Arts was under construction. Given the bias of the Victorian age, female students were denied direct study in anatomy and could not attend drawing classes with live models (who were often prostitutes) until a decade later.

At 18, Beaux was appointed as a drawing teacher at Miss Sanford's School, taking over Drinker's post. She also gave private art lessons and produced decorative art and small portraits. Her own studies were mostly self-directed. Beaux received her first introduction to lithography doing copy work for Philadelphia printer Thomas Sinclair and she published her first work in St. Nicholas magazine in December 1873. Beaux demonstrated accuracy and patience as a scientific illustrator, creating drawings of fossils for Edward Drinker Cope, for a multi-volume report sponsored by the U.S. Geological Survey. However, she did not find technical illustration suitable for a career (the extreme exactitude required gave her pains in the "solar plexus"). At this stage, she did not yet consider herself an artist.

Beaux began attending the Pennsylvania Academy of the Fine Arts in Philadelphia in 1876, then under the dynamic influence of Thomas Eakins, whose work The Gross Clinic had "horrified Philadelphia Exhibition-goers as a gory spectacle" at the Centennial Exhibition of 1876. She steered clear of the controversial Eakins, though she much admired his work. His progressive teaching philosophy, focused on anatomy and live study and allowed the female students to partake in segregated studios, eventually led to his firing as director of the academy. She did not ally herself with Eakins' ardent student supporters, and later wrote, "A curious instinct of self-preservation kept me outside the magic circle." Instead, she attended costume and portrait painting classes for three years taught by the ailing director Christian Schussele. Beaux won the Mary Smith Prize at the Pennsylvania Academy of the Fine Arts exhibitions in 1885, 1887, 1891, and 1892.

After leaving the academy, the 24-year-old Beaux decided to try her hand at porcelain painting and she enrolled in a course at the National Art Training School. She was well suited to the precise work but later wrote, "this was the lowest depth I ever reached in commercial art, and although it was a period when youth and romance were in their first attendance on me, I remember it with gloom and record it with shame." She studied privately with William Sartain, a friend of Eakins and a New York artist invited to Philadelphia to teach a group of art students, starting in 1881. Though Beaux admired Eakins more and thought his painting skill superior to Sartain's, she preferred the latter's gentle teaching style which promoted no particular aesthetic approach. Unlike Eakins, however, Sartain believed in phrenology and Beaux adopted a lifelong belief that physical characteristics correlated with behaviors and traits.

Beaux attended Sartain's classes for two years, then rented her own studio and shared it with a group of women artists who hired a live model and continued without an instructor. After the group disbanded, Beaux set in earnest to prove her artistic abilities. She painted a large canvas in 1884, Les Derniers Jours d'Enfance, a portrait of her sister and nephew whose composition and style revealed a debt to James McNeill Whistler and whose subject matter was akin to Mary Cassatt's mother-and-child paintings. It was awarded a prize for the best painting by a female artist at the academy, and further exhibited in Philadelphia and New York. Following that seminal painting, she painted over 50 portraits in the next three years with the zeal of a committed professional artist. Her invitation to serve as a juror on the hanging committee of the academy confirmed her acceptance amongst her peers. In the mid-1880s, she was receiving commissions from notable Philadelphians and earning $500 per portrait, comparable to what Eakins commanded. When her friend Margaret Bush-Brown insisted that Les Derniers was good enough to be exhibited at the famed Paris Salon, Beaux relented and sent the painting abroad in the care of her friend, who managed to get the painting into the exhibition.

=== Paris ===
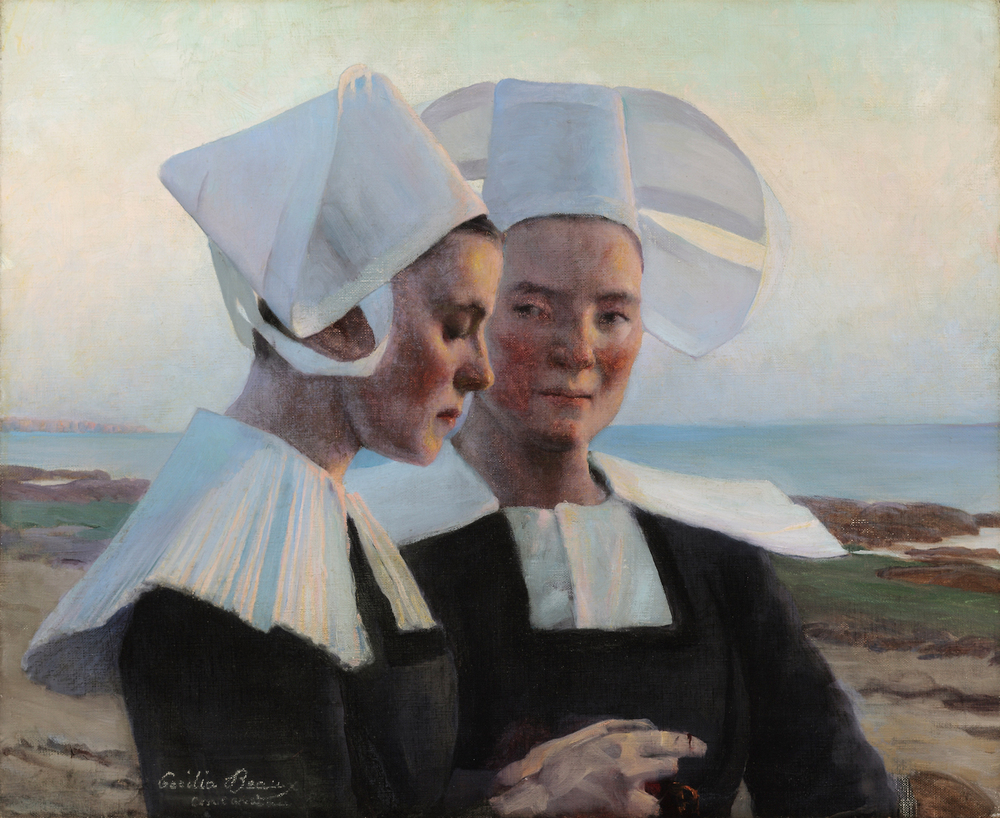
Twilight Confidences, 1888

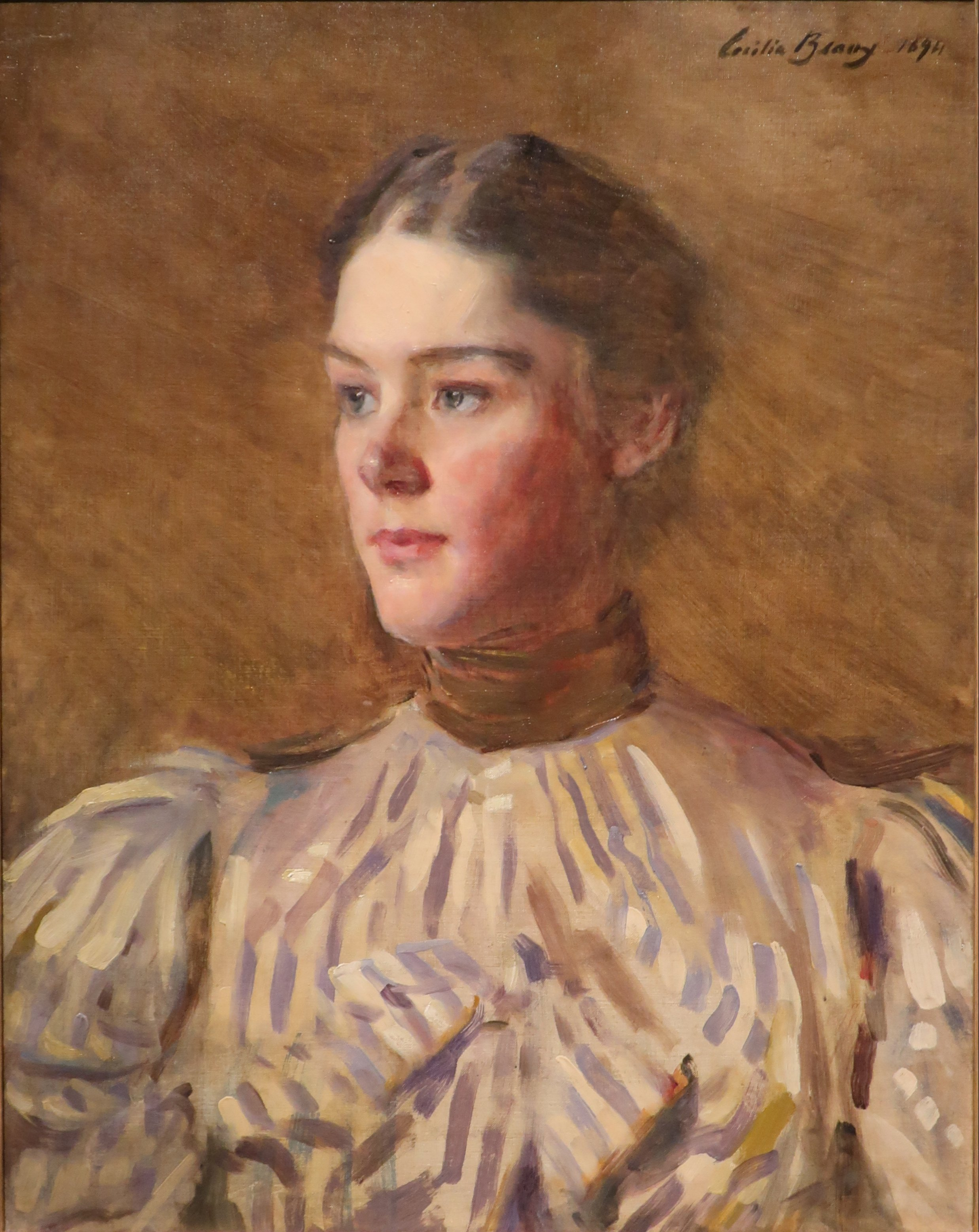
Self-portrait by Beaux in 1894

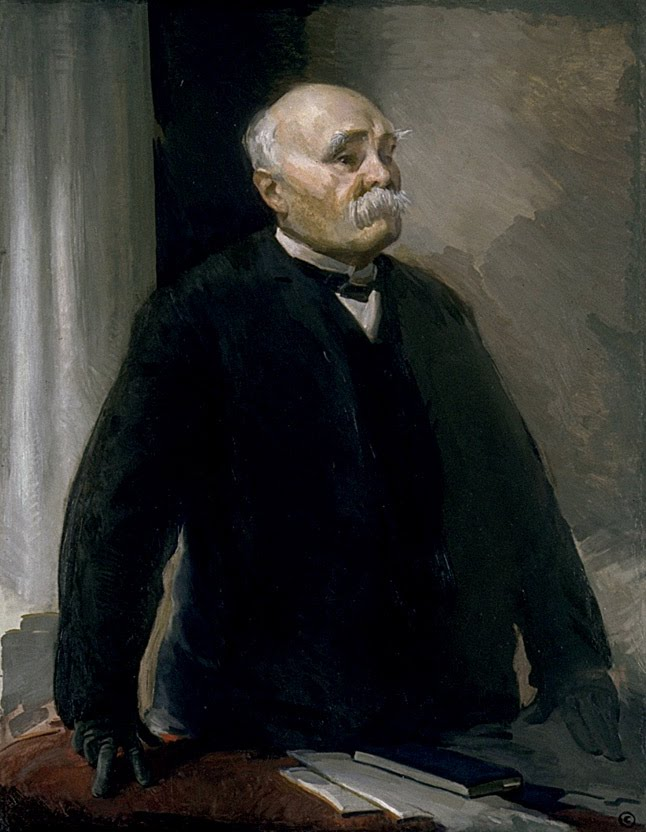
Georges Clemenceau by Cecilia Beaux (1920)

At 32, despite her success in Philadelphia, Beaux decided that she still needed to advance her skills. She left for Paris with cousin May Whitlock, forsaking several suitors and overcoming the objections of her family. There she trained at the Académie Julian, the largest art school in Paris, and at the Académie Colarossi, receiving weekly critiques from established masters like Tony Robert-Fleury and William-Adolphe Bouguereau. She wrote, "Fleury is much less benign than Bouguereau and don't temper his severities…he hinted of possibilities before me and as he rose said the nicest thing of all, 'we will do all we can to help you'…I want these men…to know me and recognize that I can do something." Though advised regularly of Beaux's progress abroad and to "not be worried about any indiscretions of ours", her Aunt Eliza repeatedly reminded her niece to avoid the temptations of Paris, "Remember you are first of all a Christian – then a woman and last of all an Artist."

When Beaux arrived in Paris, the Impressionists, a group of artists who had begun their own series of independent exhibitions from the official Salon in 1874, were beginning to lose their solidarity. Also known as the "Independents" or "Intransigents", the group which at times included Degas, Monet, Sisley, Caillebotte, Pissarro, Renoir, and Berthe Morisot, had been receiving the wrath of the critics for several years. Their art, though varying in style and technique, was the antithesis of the type of Academic art in which Beaux was trained and of which her teacher William-Adolphe Bouguereau was a leading master. In the summer of 1888, with classes in summer recess, Beaux worked in the fishing village of Concarneau with the American painters Alexander Harrison and Charles Lazar. She tried applying the plein-air painting techniques used by the Impressionists to her own landscapes and portraiture, with little success. Unlike her predecessor Mary Cassatt, who had arrived near the beginning of the Impressionist movement 15 years earlier and who had absorbed it, Beaux's artistic temperament, precise and true to observation, would not align with Impressionism and she remained a realist painter for the rest of her career, even as Cézanne, Matisse, Gauguin, and Picasso were beginning to take art into new directions. Beaux mostly admired classic artists like Titian and Rembrandt. Her European training did influence her palette, however, and she adopted more white and paler coloration in her oil painting, particularly in depicting female subjects, an approach favored by Sargent as well.

=== Return to Philadelphia ===
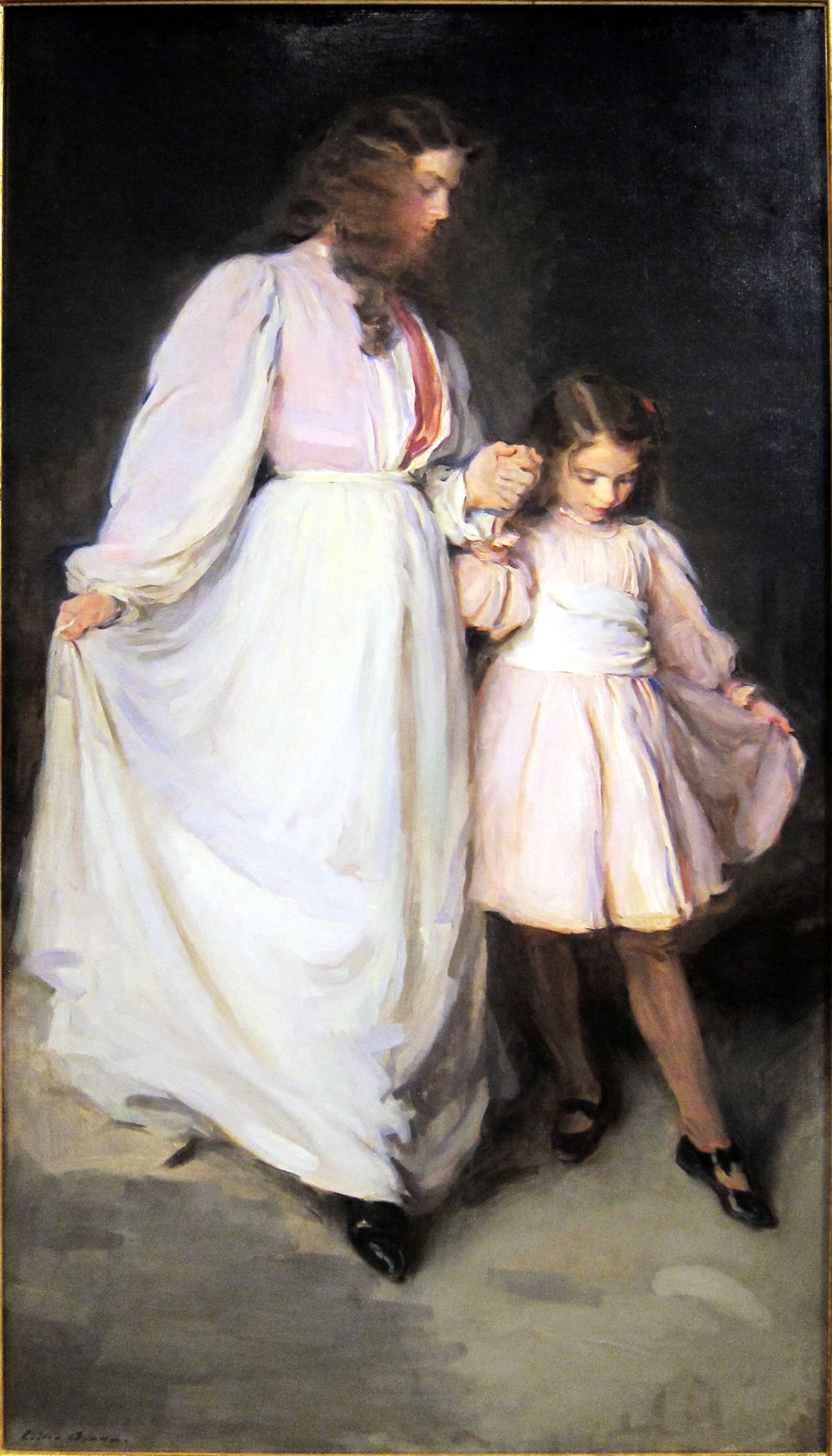
Dorothea and Francesca in 1898

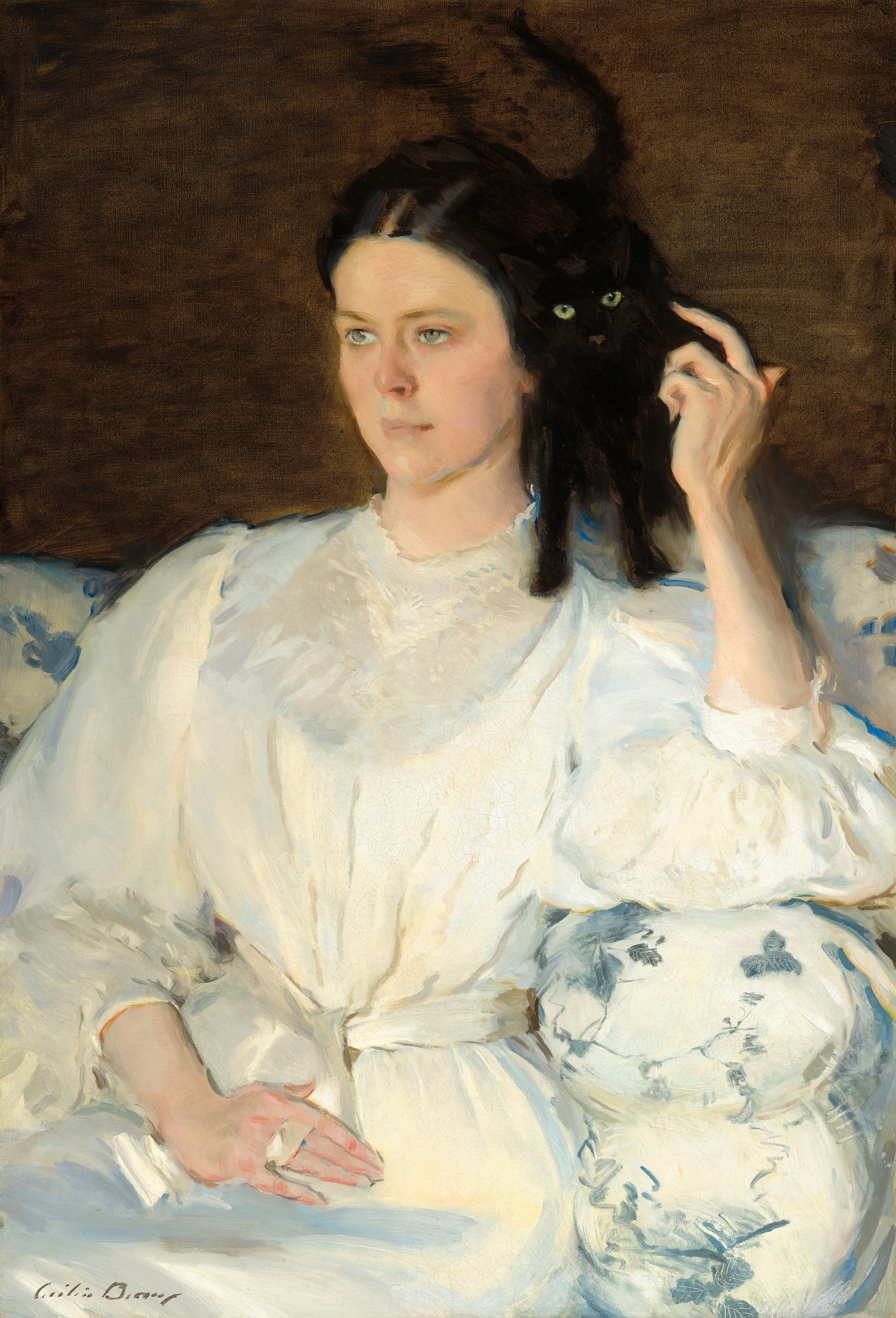
Sita and Sarita (Jeune Fille au Chat), a portrait of Sarah Allibone Leavitt, 1893–1894, now on display at the Musée d'Orsay in Paris

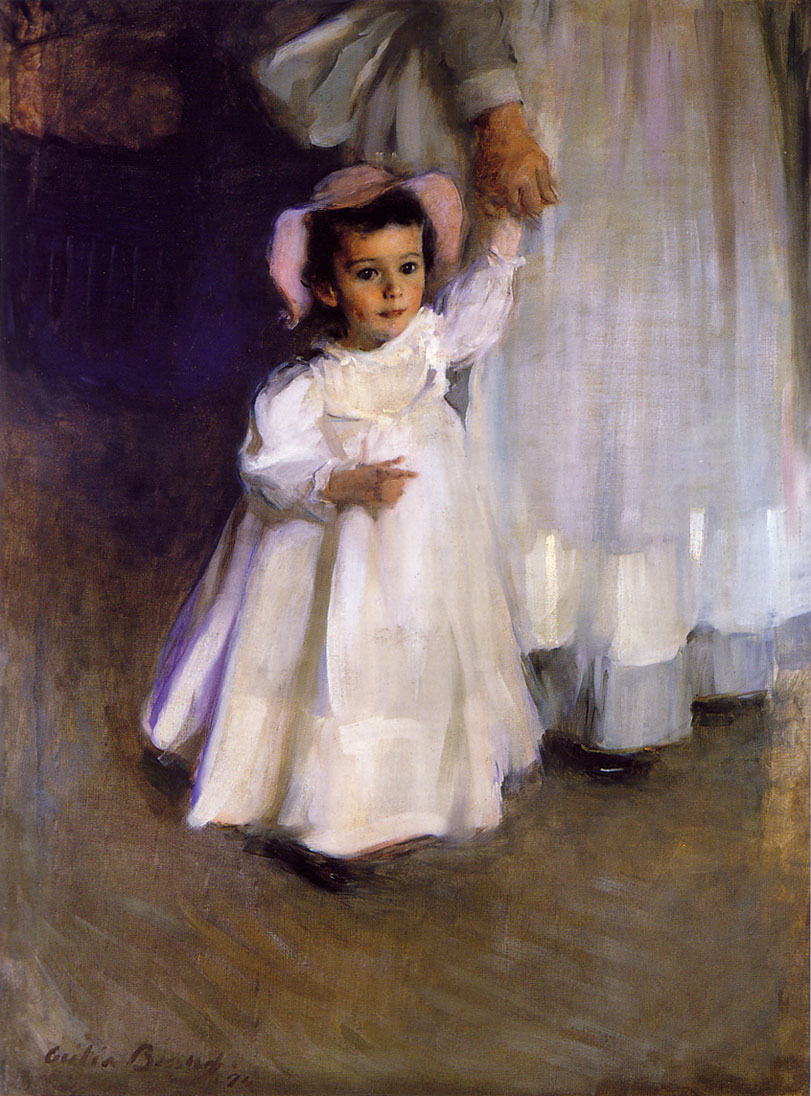
Ernesta by Cecilia Beaux 1894

Back in the United States in 1889, Beaux proceeded to paint portraits in the grand manner, taking as her subjects members of her sister's family and of Philadelphia's elite. In making her decision to devote herself to art, she also thought it was best not to marry, and in choosing male company she selected men who would not threaten to sidetrack her career. She resumed life with her family, and they supported her fully, acknowledging her chosen path and demanding of her little in the way of household responsibilities, "I was never once asked to do an errand in town, some bit of shopping…so well did they understand." She developed a structured, professional routine, arriving promptly at her studio, and expected the same from her models.

The five years that followed were highly productive, resulting in over forty portraits. In 1890 she exhibited at the Paris Exposition, obtained in 1893 the gold medal of the Philadelphia Art Club, and also the Dodge prize at the New York National Academy of Design. She exhibited her work at the Palace of Fine Arts and The Woman's Building at the 1893 World's Columbian Exposition in Chicago, Illinois. Her portrait of The Reverend Matthew Blackburne Grier was particularly well-received, as was Sita and Sarita, a portrait of her cousin Charles W. Leavitt's wife Sarah (Allibone) Leavitt in white, with a small black cat perched on her shoulder, both gazing out mysteriously. The mesmerizing effect prompted one critic to point out "the witch-like weirdness of the black kitten" and for many years, the painting solicited questions by the press. But the result was not pre-planned, as Beaux's sister later explained, "Please make no mystery about it—it was only an idea to put the black kitten on her cousin's shoulder. Nothing deeper." Beaux donated Sita and Sarita to the Musée du Luxembourg, but only after making a copy for herself. Another highly regarded portrait from that period is New England Woman (1895), a nearly all-white oil painting which was purchased by the Pennsylvania Academy of the Fine Arts.

In 1895, Beaux became the first woman to have a regular teaching position at the Pennsylvania Academy of the Fine Arts, where she instructed in portrait drawing and painting for the next twenty years. That rare type of achievement by a woman prompted one local newspaper to state, "It is a legitimate source of pride to Philadelphia that one of its most cherished institutions has made this innovation." She was a popular instructor. In 1896, Beaux returned to France to see a group of her paintings presented at the Salon. Influential French critic M. Henri Rochefort commented, "I am compelled to admit, not without some chagrin, that not one of our female artists…is strong enough to compete with the lady who has given us this year the portrait of Dr. Grier. Composition, flesh, texture, sound drawing—everything is there without affectation, and without seeking for effect." In 1898, Beaux painted probably her finest portrait, Man with the Cat (Henry Sturgis Drinker), now in Smithsonian American Art Museum. Drinker was Beaux's very successful brother-in-law.

Cecilia Beaux considered herself a "New Woman", a 19th-century woman who explored educational and career opportunities that had generally been denied to women. In the late 19th century Charles Dana Gibson depicted the "New Woman" in his painting, The Reason Dinner was Late, which is "a sympathetic portrayal of artistic aspiration on the part of young women" as she paints a visiting policeman. This "New Woman" was successful, highly trained, and often did not marry; other such women included Ellen Day Hale, Mary Cassatt, Elizabeth Nourse and Elizabeth Coffin.

Beaux was a member of Philadelphia's The Plastic Club. Other members included Elenore Abbott, Jessie Willcox Smith, Violet Oakley, Emily Sartain, and Elizabeth Shippen Green. Many of the women who founded the organization had been students of Howard Pyle. It was founded to provide a means to encourage one another professionally and create opportunities to sell their works of art.

=== New York City ===
By 1900 the demand for Beaux's work brought clients from Washington, D.C., to Boston, prompting the artist to move to New York City, where she spent the winters, while summering at Green Alley, the home and studio she had built in Gloucester, Massachusetts. Beaux's friendship with Richard Gilder, editor-in-chief of the literary magazine The Century, helped promote her career and he introduced her to the elite of society. Among her portraits which followed from that association are those of Georges Clemenceau; First Lady Edith Roosevelt and her daughter; and Admiral Sir David Beatty. She also sketched President Theodore Roosevelt during her White House visits in 1902, during which "He sat for two hours, talking most of the time, reciting Kipling, and reading scraps of Browning." Beaux also became very close with Gilder's daughter Dorothea, and the two women exchanged affectionate letters for many years. Her portraits Fanny Travis Cochran, Dorothea and Francesca, and Ernesta and her Little Brother, are fine examples of her skill in painting children; Ernesta with Nurse, one of a series of essays in luminous white, was a highly original composition, seemingly without precedent. She became a member of the National Academy of Design in 1902. and won the Logan Medal of the arts at the Art Institute of Chicago in 1921.

=== Green Alley ===
By 1906, Beaux began to live year-round at Green Alley, in a comfortable colony of "cottages" belonging to her wealthy friends and neighbors. All three aunts had died and she needed an emotional break from Philadelphia and New York City. She managed to find new subjects for portraiture, working in the mornings and enjoying a leisurely life the rest of the time. She carefully regulated her energy and her activities to maintain a productive output, and considered that a key to her success. On why so few women succeeded in art as she did, she stated, "Strength is the stumbling block. They (women) are sometimes unable to stand the hard work of it day in and day out. They become tired and cannot reenergize themselves."

While Beaux stuck to her portraits of the elite, American art was advancing into urban and social subject matter, led by artists such as Robert Henri who espoused a totally different aesthetic, "Work with great speed..Have your energies alert, up and active. Do it all in one sitting if you can. In one minute if you can. There is no use delaying…Stop studying water pitchers and bananas and paint everyday life." He advised his students, among them Edward Hopper and Rockwell Kent, to live with the common man and paint the common man, in total opposition to Cecilia Beaux's artistic methods and subjects. The clash of Henri and William Merritt Chase (representing Beaux and the traditional art establishment) resulted in 1907 in the independent exhibition by the urban realists known as "The Eight" or the Ashcan School. Beaux and her art friends defended the old order, and many thought (and hoped) the new movement to be a passing fad, but it turned out to be a revolutionary turn in American art.

In 1910, her beloved Uncle Willie died. Though devastated by the loss, at 55 year old, Beaux remained highly productive. In the next five years she painted almost 25 percent of her lifetime output and received a steady stream of honors. She had a major exhibition of 35 paintings at the Corcoran Gallery of Art in Washington, D.C., in 1912. Despite her continuing production and accolades, however, Beaux was working against the current of tastes and trends in art. The famed "Armory Show" of 1913 in New York City was a landmark presentation of 1,200 paintings showcasing Modernism. Beaux believed that the public, initially of mixed opinion about the "new" art, would ultimately reject it and return its favor to the Pre-Impressionists.

Beaux was crippled after breaking her hip while walking in Paris in 1924. With her health impaired, her work output dwindled for the remainder of her life. That same year Beaux was asked to produce a self-portrait for the Medici collection in the Uffizi Gallery in Florence. In 1930 she published an autobiography, Background with Figures. Her later life was filled with honors. In 1930 she was elected a member of the National Institute of Arts and Letters; in 1933 came membership in the American Academy of Arts and Letters, which two years later organized the first major retrospective of her work. Also in 1933 Eleanor Roosevelt honored Beaux as "the American woman who had made the greatest contribution to the culture of the world". In 1942 The National Institute of Arts and Letters awarded her a gold medal for lifetime achievement.

== Death ==
Beaux died at the age of 87 on September 17, 1942, in Gloucester, Massachusetts. She was interred at West Laurel Hill Cemetery in Bala Cynwyd, Pennsylvania. In her will she left a Duncan Phyfe rosewood secretaire made for her father to her cherished nephew Cecil Kent Drinker, a Harvard University physician whom she had painted as a young boy and who later founded the Harvard School of Public Health.

== Legacy ==
Beaux was included in the 2018 exhibit Women in Paris 1850-1900 at the Clark Art Institute.

Though Beaux was an individualist, comparisons to Sargent would prove inevitable, and often favorable. Her strong technique, her perceptive reading of her subjects, and her ability to flatter without falsifying, were traits similar to his. "The critics are very enthusiastic. (Bernard) Berenson, Mrs. Coates tells me, stood in front of the portraits – Miss Beaux's three – and wagged his head. 'Ah, yes, I see!' Some Sargents. The ordinary ones are signed John Sargent, the best are signed Cecilia Beaux, which is, of course, nonsense in more ways than one, but it is part of the generous chorus of praise." Though overshadowed by Mary Cassatt and relatively unknown to museum-goers today, Beaux's craftsmanship and extraordinary output were highly regarded in her time. While presenting the Carnegie Institute's Gold Medal to Beaux in 1899, William Merritt Chase stated "Miss Beaux is not only the greatest living woman painter, but the best that has ever lived. Miss Beaux has done away entirely with sex [gender] in art."

During her long productive life as an artist, she maintained her personal aesthetic and high standards against all distractions and countervailing forces. She constantly struggled for perfection. "A perfect technique in anything," she stated in an interview, "means that there has been no break in continuity between the conception and the act of performance." She summed up her driving work ethic, "I can say this: When I attempt anything, I have a passionate determination to overcome every obstacle…And I do my own work with a refusal to accept defeat that might almost be called painful."

== Gallery ==
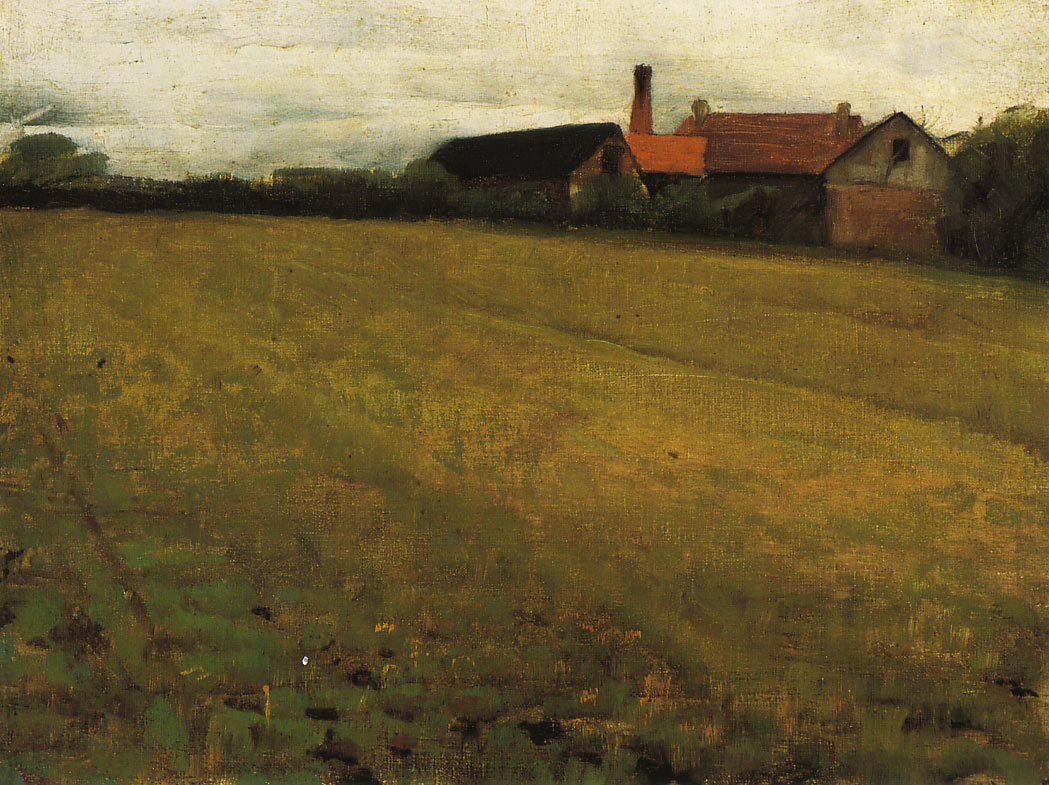
Landscape with Farm Building, 1888

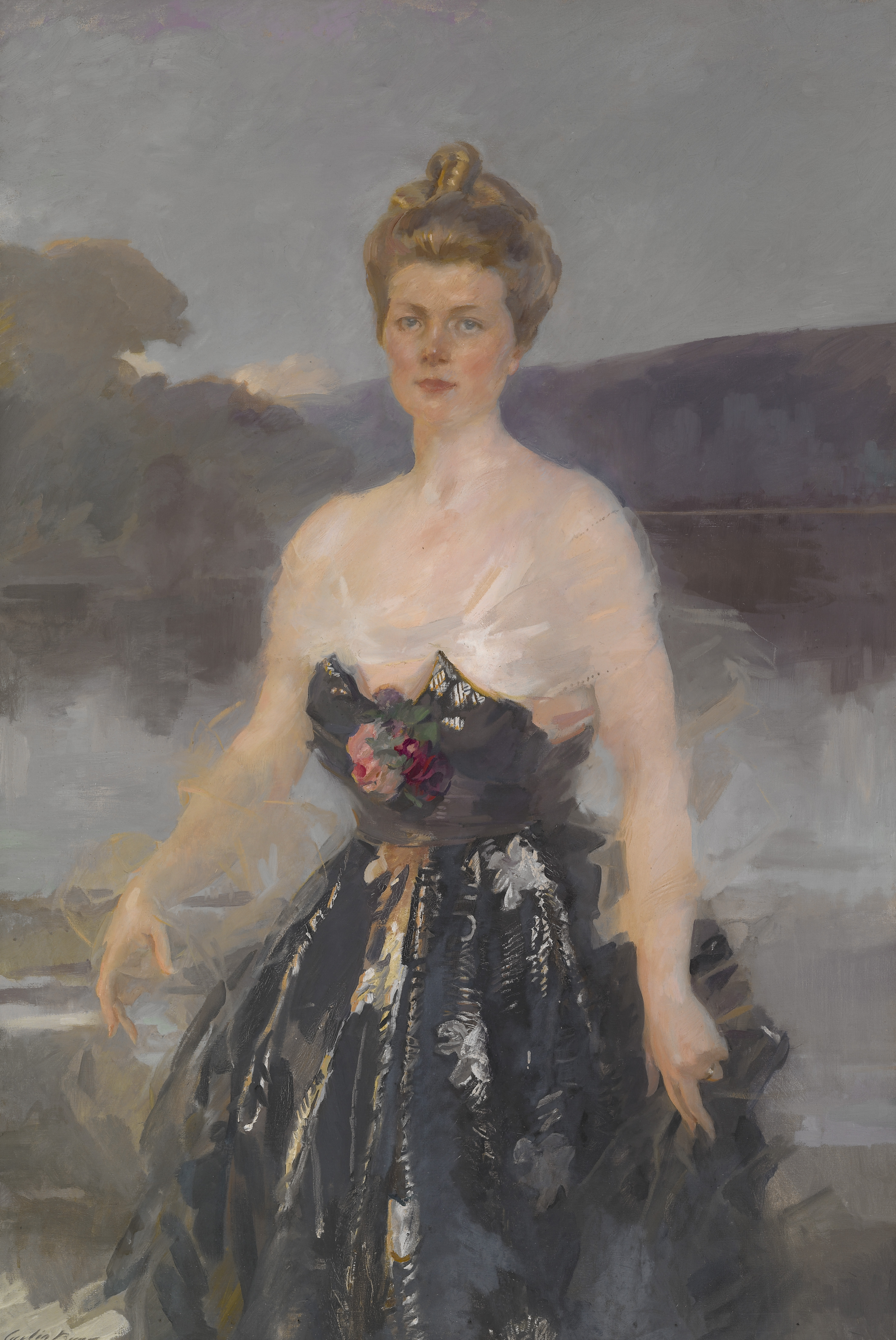
Portrait of Mrs. Albert J. Beveridge, 1916

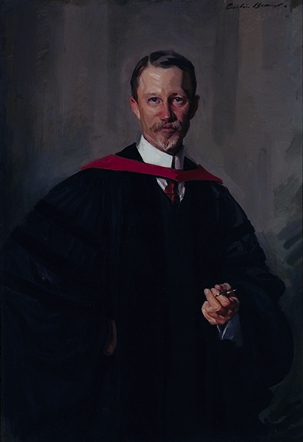
Painting of William Henry Howell (1919)

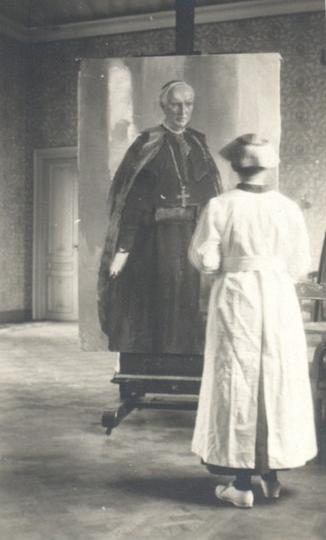
Cecilia Beaux painting of Cardinal Mercier (c. 1919)

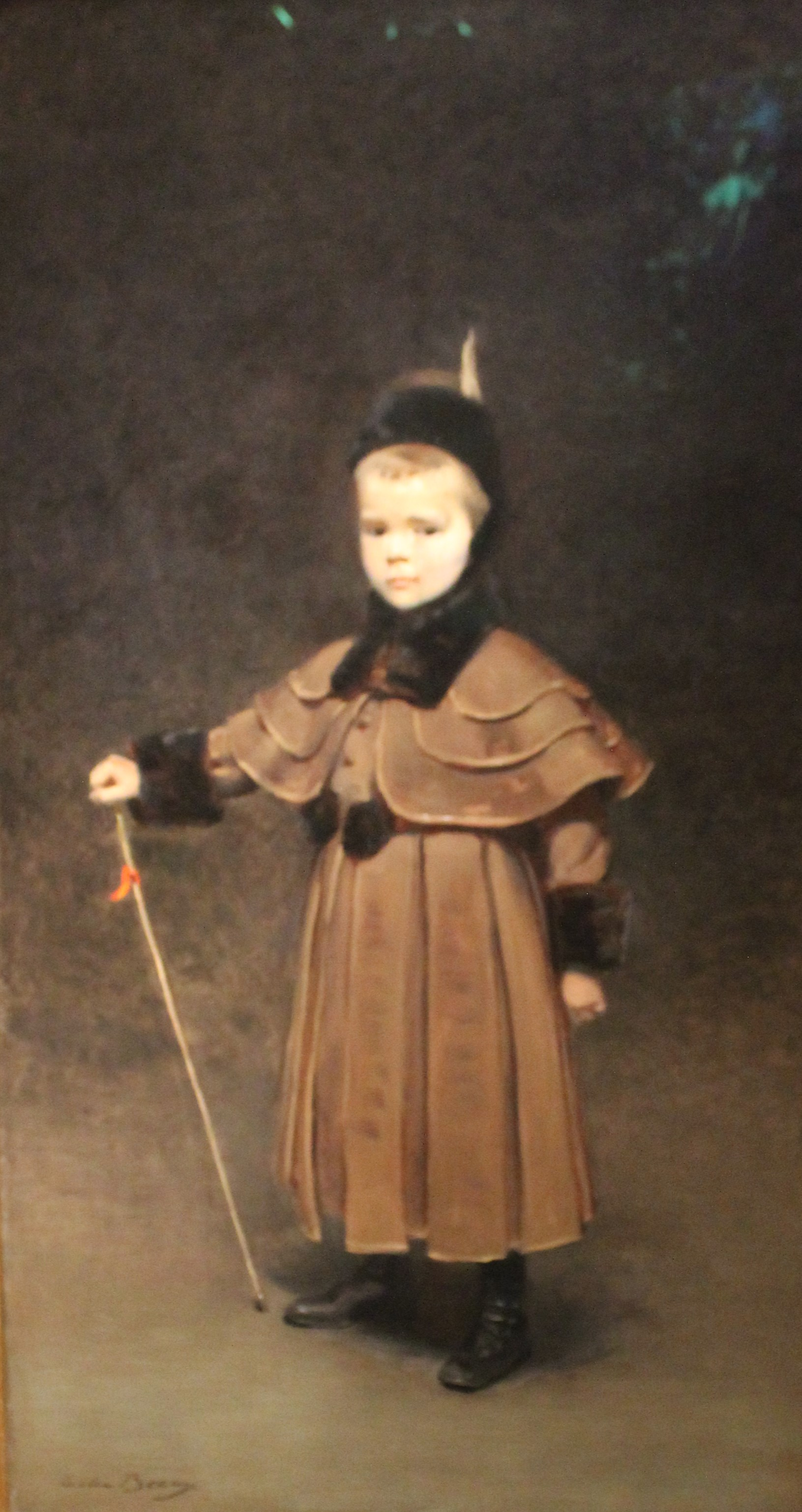
Portrait of Cecil Kent Drinker, 1891

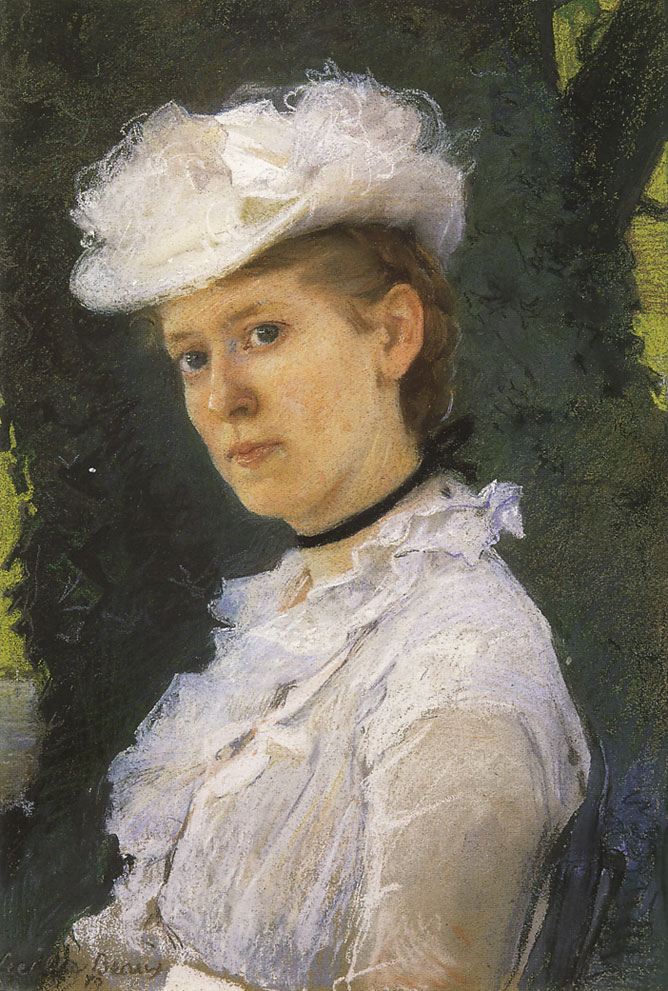
Lady George Darwin, Beaux's pastel portrait of the former Martha du Puy of Philadelphia, who married Sir George Darwin. 1889

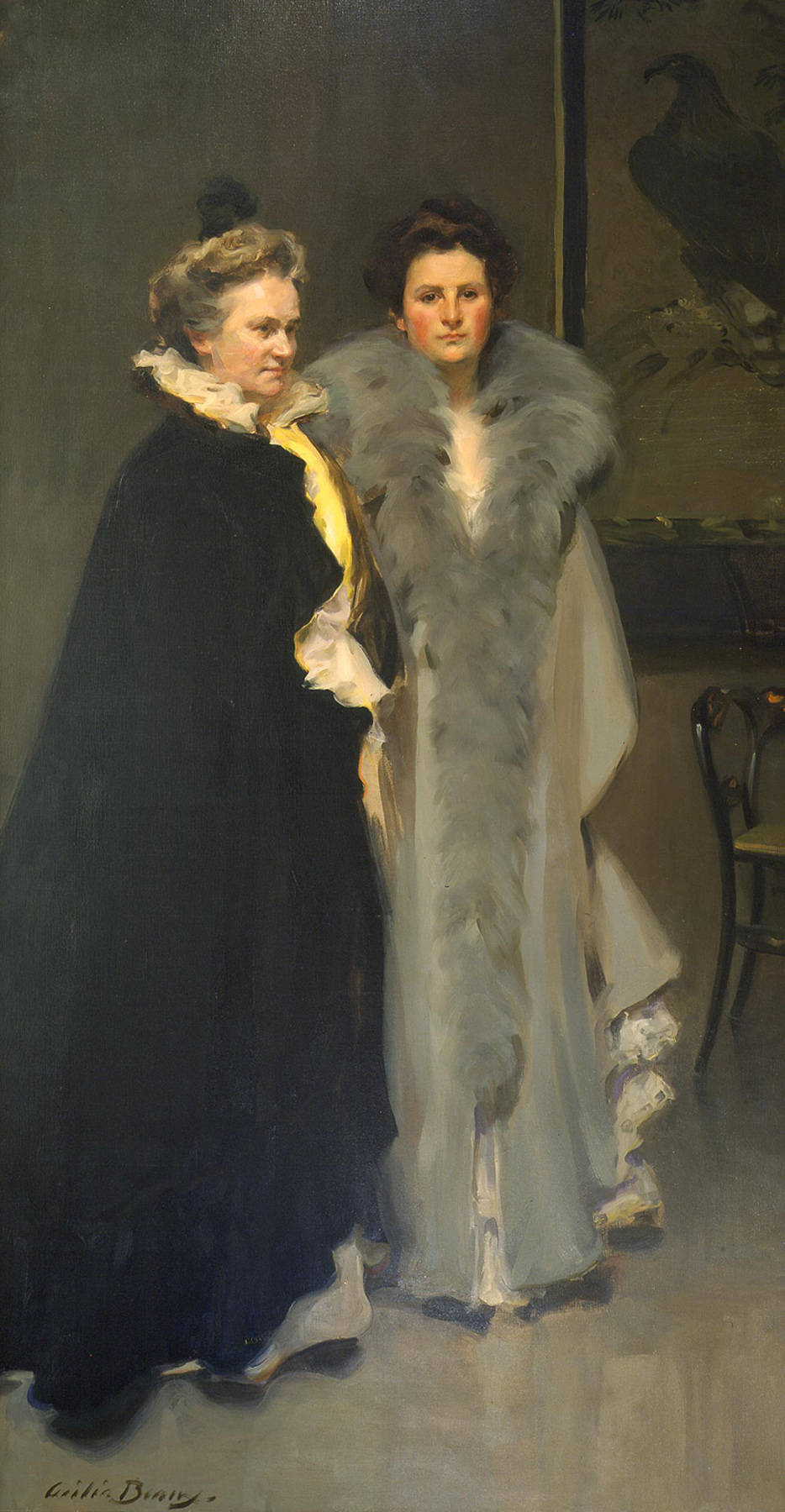
Mother and Daughter Cecilia Beaux 1898

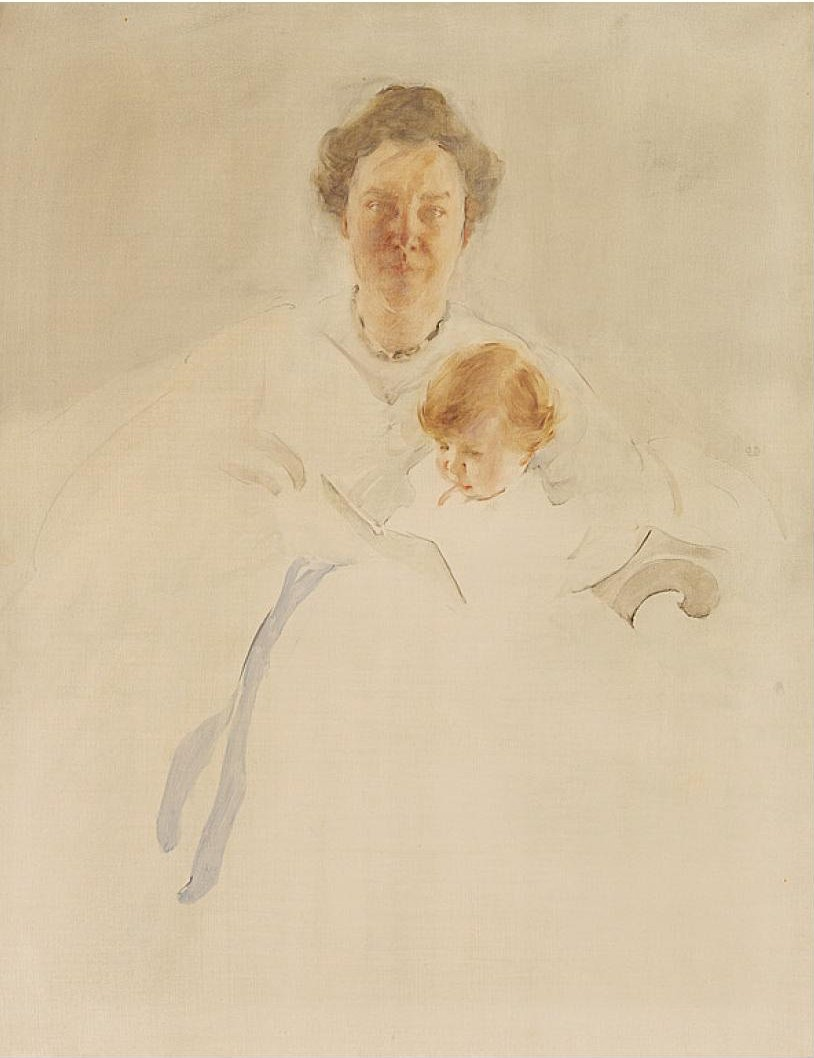
Mrs. Robert Chapin and Daughter Christina by Cecilia Beaux, 1902

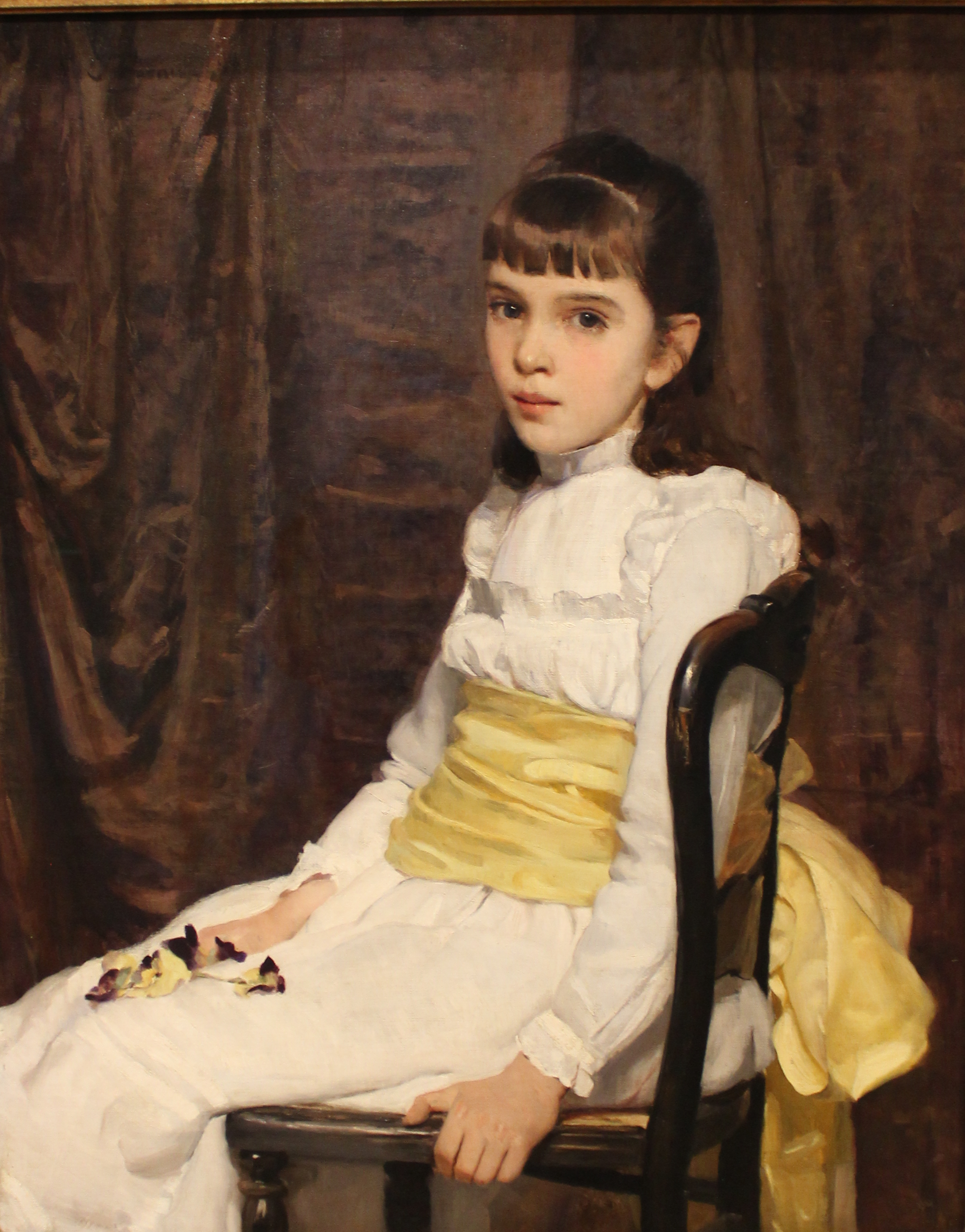
A Little Girl (1887)

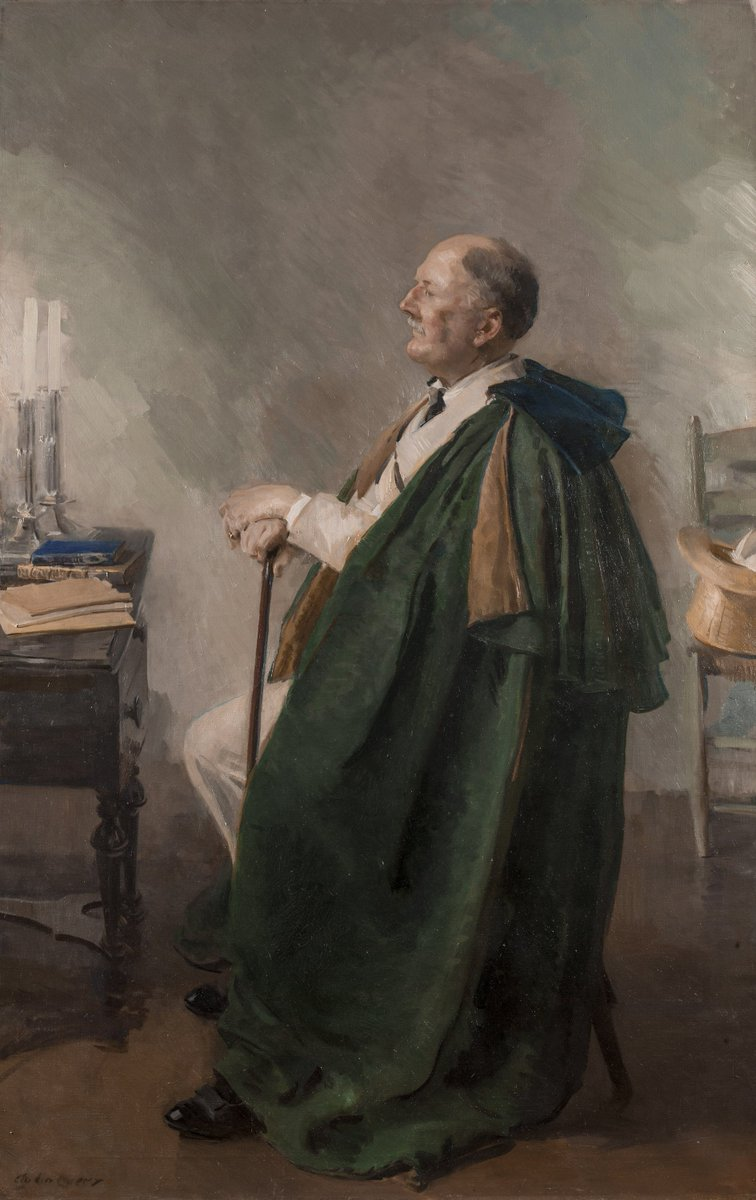
The Green Cloak, a portrait of George Dudley Seymour, on display at the Wadsworth Atheneum (1925)
