= Elmira Y. Howard =

American doctor

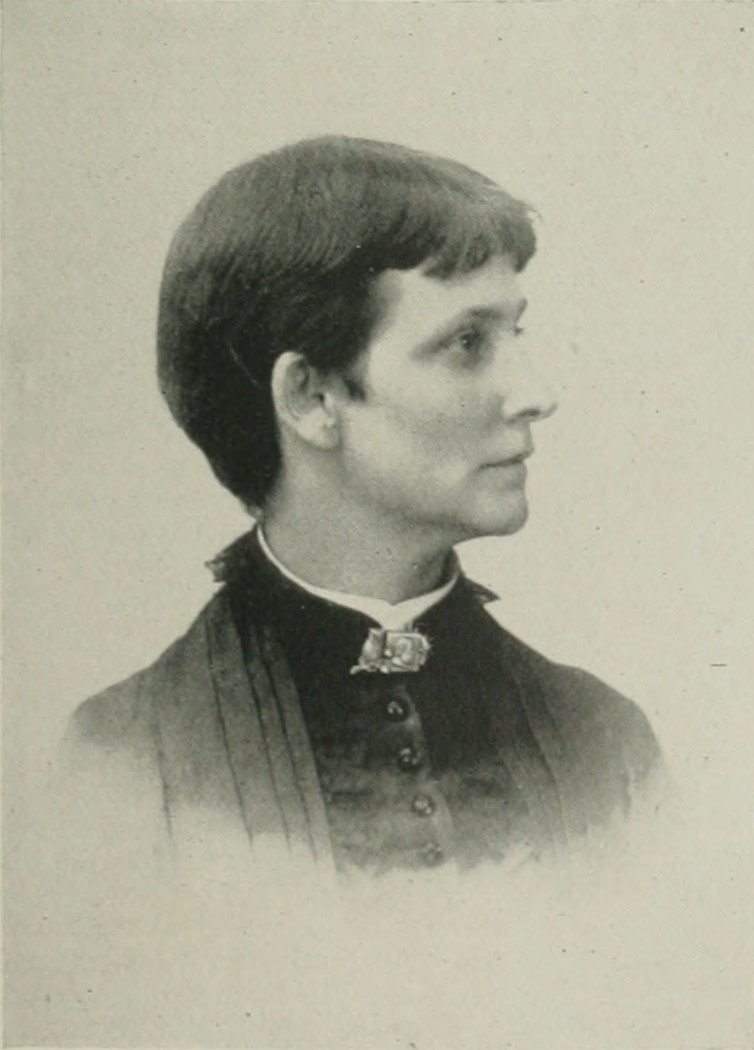
- Born: May 3, 1841; Shelby, Ohio, US
- Died: August 7, 1921 (aged 80); Covington, Kentucky, US
- Education: New York Medical College for Women
- Occupation: Physician

Elmira Y. Howard (3 May 1841 – 7 August 1921) was an American doctor and the first woman to open a medical practice in Cincinnati, Ohio. She was called "the first woman physician to practise west of the Allegheny Mountains".

== Life ==
Elmira Y. Howard was born in Shelby, Ohio on 3 May 1841.

In 1859, she married Jerome B. Howard, an artist. Jerome B. Howard, as an artist, was connected with the State Normal School of New York. They couple had three children: two boys and a girl.

When the Civil War broke out, Jerome Howard volunteered. He was taken prisoner and died in Andersonville prison. Elmira Howard was 23 years old.

The Howards' daughter, Ellen Jeanette, died in 1909 from consumption. Until her illness, Ellen Howard had co-owned and run a bookstore in Palmyra, Missouri.

== Medical career ==
Howard decided to study medicine, partly inspired by her daughter's disability. At the age of 27, she went to New York, where she entered the New York Medical College for Women. There, she studied alongside Susan McKinney Steward. Howard graduated in 1869.

That year, Howard moved to Cincinnati, Ohio, where she opened an office for practice: the first woman in the city to do so. After three years developing the practice, in 1873, Howard went to Europe. There, she worked and studied in the Vienna General Hospital for nine months. She studied both allopathy and homeopathy.

Howard was also secretary of the Cincinnati Theosophical Society.

After 25 years in practice in Cincinnati, Howard moved to Marion County, Missouri. There, she continued to practice medicine, specializing in diseases of women and children, until her retirement.

In 1894, Elizabeth Nourse, whose twin sister Howard probably attended during her last illness, was commissioned to create a portrait of Howard.

== Later years and death ==
During the last three years of her life, she lived with her son, Dr. Jerome Howard in Covington, Kentucky. She died there on Sunday 7 August 1921.
