= Peter H. Clark =

American abolitionist (1829–1925)

Peter Humphries Clark
- Clark in the late 19th century
- Born: March 29, 1829; Cincinnati, Ohio, U.S.
- Died: June 21, 1925 (aged 96); St. Louis, Missouri, U.S.
- Occupations: Abolitionist, publisher, editor, writer, orator, civil rights activist
- Political party: Republican (1850s-1872); Workingmen's (1876-1878); Socialist Labor (1878-1879)
- Spouse: Francis Ann Williams (m. 1854)
- Children: 3

Peter Humphries Clark (March 29, 1829 – June 21, 1925) was an American abolitionist and speaker. One of Ohio's most effective black abolitionist writers and speakers, he became the first teacher engaged by the Cincinnati black public schools in 1849, and the founder and principal of Ohio's first public high school for black students in 1866. Because of these accomplishments, he was named the nation's primary black public school educator. Clark is also remembered as the first African-American socialist in the United States, running for Congress in 1878 under the banner of the Socialist Labor Party of America.

== Early life ==
Peter Humphries Clark was born in March 1829, in Cincinnati, Ohio, to Michael Clark. William Clark, leader of the Lewis and Clark Expedition, fathered multiple children with a black woman, Michael being one of them. Cincinnati High School, the first high school for the education of black people, admitted Clark in 1844. Later in his life he received a masters (A.M.) degree from Wilberforce University.

== Career ==
After leaving school in 1848, Clark declined to work as a barber with his father and instead apprenticed under Thomas Varney. Schools for black children were established in Cincinnati, but the local government refused to provide them funding. Clark became a teacher at one of these schools in 1849, and taught without pay for two years before courts ruled in favor of the schools. He was given $105 in backpay.

During the next four years, Peter was an abolitionist publisher, editor, writer, and speaker. He participated in the Ohio Conventions of Colored Men, and edited and published his own weekly newspaper. He was appointed secretary of the 1853 National Convention of Colored Men in Syracuse, New York, by Frederick Douglass, where he drafted a constitution of the National Equal Rights League. He also served as a conductor for the Underground Railroad. In 1854 he married Francis Ann Williams.

In 1855 he formed the journal, Herald of Freedom, which quickly failed. He then became editor of a Free Soil Party journal published in Newport, Kentucky, owned by William S. Bailey. In 1856 he was on the staff of The North Star, Frederick Douglass's paper. In 1857 he was rehired by the black trustees of the colored schools and made principal of the Western District School in Cincinnati. Whilst in Cincinnati he founded a union for black teachers.

Clark became principal of Gaines High School in 1866, and held that post until 1886, when he was fired on political grounds. He left Cincinnati in 1887 to serve as principal of the Alabama State Normal and Industrial School, and in 1888 went to St. Louis where he taught at the segregated Sumner High School for twenty years.

== Political activity ==
Clark was an abolitionist. In the first fugitive slave case in Ohio in 1853, George Washington McQuerry was taken into custody by men claiming he was an escaped slave. Clark was able to obtain a writ of habeas corpus from Judge John McLean so the case could go before the court. The case was unsuccessful and McQuerry was forced back into slavery.

Clark became a member of the Republican Party in the 1850s. He joined the Liberal Republicans in 1872, but left after they nominated Horace Greeley for president. He attended the 1876 Republican National Convention and supported Rutherford B. Hayes in the presidential election.

On March 26, 1877, Clark renounced the Republicans and joined the Workingmen's Party of the United States. He supported the Great Railroad Strike of 1877 and gave speeches to the strikes where he condemned their repression by the state and federal government and the economic crisis. In his speeches he called for the railroads to be nationalized and that the "title of private owners should be extinguished". Later that year he unsuccessfully ran as the Workingmen's candidate for state school commissioner, becoming the first black socialist to run for office in the United States.

In 1878 he ran for congress on the Workingmen's Party ticket, one of the party's first congressional candidates. He ran in Ohio's 1st congressional district, garnering 275 votes, or 1.09%.

The Socialist Labor Party of America selected Clark to become a member of its National Executive Committee in 1878. Threats were made to remove him as principal of Gaines High School if he remained in the SLP, but these attempts failed due to "the colored people of Cincinnati, who had stood by me all my life-time, cam to my rescue" according to Clark. On July 21, 1879, he left the SLP as the party was not appealing to the interests of black people, but stated that he was still a socialist. In 1882, he aided county Democrats in organizing a civil rights bill, which passed into law.

== Death and legacy ==
Clark had three children, daughters Ernestine and Consuelo, and son Herbert. Consuelo graduated from the Boston University School of Medicine and became the first African American woman to practice medicine in Ohio.

Clark died on June 21, 1925.

== Works ==
- Black Brigade of Cincinnati: Being a Report of Its Labors and a Muster-Roll of Its Members etc. [1864] Ohio Historical Society.
- "Socialism: The Remedy for the Evils of Society,” 1877.

== See also ==
- List of African-American abolitionists

== Works cited ==
- Foner, Philip (1977). American Socialism and Black Americans: From The Age of Jackson to World War II. Greenwood Publishing Group. ISBN 0837195454.
