= Gaines High School =

Coordinates: 39.1054°N 84.5224°W

- Cincinnati, (Hamilton County), Ohio; United States

Information
- Opened: 1866
- Closed: 1887, or 1890
- Principal: Peter H. Clark, William H. Parham
- Grades: 9–12

Gaines High School was a high school for African American students, and later served as a normal school for teacher training in Cincinnati, Ohio. It was founded in 1866 and named for John Ishom Gaines. It closed around 1887.

== History ==
Gaines High School was preceded by the privately funded Gilmore High School (also known as Cincinnati High School or Cincinnati High School for Colored People).

Gaines High School opened in 1866. It was named for school board member John Isom Gaines, who was an advocate of schools for African Americans in Ohio. It was one of Ohio's first public high schools for African Americans.

Peter Humphries Clark and then William H. Parham served as its principals. Clark introduced baseball as part of the school's program. Clark became a Socialist and joined the Democratic Party, costing him support in the African American community and his job.

The year of the school's closure is uncertain; sources say 1887 or 1890. A historical marker commemorates the school.

E. E. White eliminated the highest grade offered at Gaines High School, a high school for African Americans in Cincinnati, stopping it from produccing additional high school graduates.

== Alumni ==
- John Welden Jewett.
- Fannie Emanuel
- Charles Henry Turner
