= List of people from Cincinnati =

This is a list of notable residents of Cincinnati, Ohio.

== Politics ==
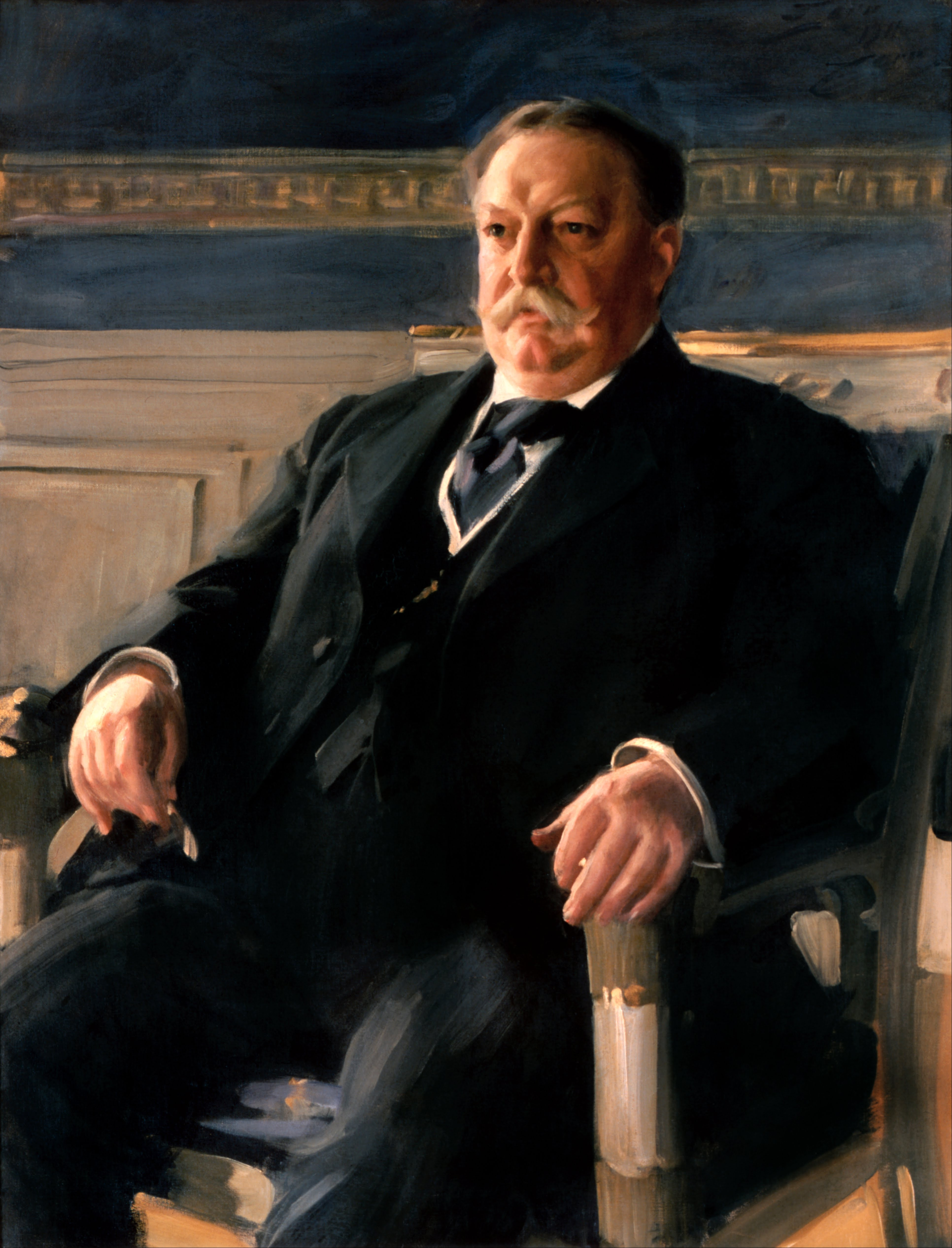
William Howard Taft, the 27th president of the United States

- Stan Aronoff – member of Ohio Senate 1967–1996, its president 1989–96
- William Evans Arthur (1825–1897) – born in Cincinnati, United States congressman from Kentucky
- Steve Austria – Republican congressman, 2009–2013
- Jess L. Baily – United States ambassador to North Macedonia, 2015–2019
- Walt Bachrach – long-serving mayor of Cincinnati
- Ken Blackwell – former mayor of Cincinnati 1999–2007, Republican, Ohio secretary of state and unsuccessful 2006 candidate for governor of Ohio
- James G. Birney – abolitionist and Liberty Party presidential candidate
- John Boehner – congressman and former speaker of the House
- Tom Brinkman – Republican Ohio House of Representatives member
- Jacob Burnet – U.S. senator, 1828–1831
- Phillip Burton – Democratic congressman from California
- Benjamin Butterworth – Republican congressman, 1879–1883, 1885–1891
- Mary Edith Campbell – suffragette, board of education member
- Samuel Fenton Cary – congressman and temperance movement leader
- John Cranley – former mayor of Cincinnati, 2013–2022
- Steve Chabot – Republican congressman, 1995–2009; 2011–2023
- Donald D. Clancy – former Republican congressman
- Levi Coffin – abolitionist, member of the Underground Railroad
- Moses Dickson – Abolitionist leader
- Ozro J. Dodds – Democratic congressman, 1872–1873
- Steve Driehaus – Democratic congressman, 2009–2011
- Edwin Einstein – Republican congressman from New York, 1879–1881
- Richard Kenneth Fox – United States ambassador to Trinidad and Tobago, 1977–1979
- John J. Gilligan – former governor of Ohio
- Bill Gradison – Republican congressman, former mayor of Cincinnati
- Buddy Gray – activist and social worker
- William S. Groesbeck – lawyer, Democratic congressman, 1857–1859
- George W. Hayes – former slave, Republican Ohio House of Representatives member
- Dave Hobson – former Republican congressman
- Henry Thomas Hunt – former mayor of Cincinnati, 1912–1913
- Andy Ireland – Democrat/Republican congressman from Florida, 1977–1993
- B. Todd Jones – lawyer, director of the Bureau of Alcohol, Tobacco, Firearms and Explosives 2011–2015
- William J. Keating – former Republican congressman, brother of Charles Keating
- Greg Landsman – Democratic congressman, 2023–, former member of the Cincinnati city councilman, 2018–2022
- Simon L. Leis, Jr. – Hamilton County, Ohio prosecutor and sheriff
- Jesse D. Locker – former Cincinnati city councilman and United States ambassador to Liberia, 1953–55
- Nicholas Longworth – former speaker of the House and majority leader
- Charlie Luken – former congressman and mayor of Cincinnati
- Tom Luken – former congressman
- Mark L. Mallory – former mayor of Cincinnati, 2005–2013
- William L. Mallory, Sr. – first African-American Ohio House of Representatives majority leader
- Sam Malone – former Cincinnati city councilman
- Neil H. McElroy – secretary of defense, 1957–1959
- Tom Mooney – teacher, labor union activist
- Edward Follansbee Noyes – governor of Ohio, ambassador to France
- Kabaka Oba – civil rights activist
- Lucy Evelyn Peabody – conservation activist
- Aaron F. Perry – congressman, 1871–1872
- Rob Portman – congressman, United States Trade Representative; director of Office of Management and Budget; U.S. senator 2011–2023
- Todd Portune – former Cincinnati city councilman
- Ayanna Pressley – U.S. representative for Massachusetts
- Aftab Pureval – mayor of Cincinnati
- Trey Radel – former Republican congressman from Florida
- Lindsay Reynolds – chief of staff to First Lady of the United States Melania Trump
- Eugene P. Ruehlmann – mayor of Cincinnati, 1967–1971
- Jerry Rubin – political activist, Chicago Seven
- Charles W. Sawyer – United States secretary of commerce, 1948–1953 under President Harry Truman
- Bob Schaffer – former Republican congressman from Colorado
- Jean Schmidt – Republican congresswoman, 2005–2013; Ohio state senator 2001–2004, 2021–
- Bob Schuler – Ohio state senator, 2002–2009
- P.G. Sittenfeld – former Cincinnati city councilman, convicted of felony bribery, later pardoned
- Kathleen Sebelius – governor of Kansas 2003–2009, U.S. secretary of Health and Human Services 2009–14
- Christopher Smitherman – former Cincinnati city councilman
- Potter Stewart – lawyer, U.S. Supreme Court justice, 1958–1981
- Charles Phelps Taft II – mayor of Cincinnati, 1955–1957
- Patricia Taft – charter board member of the National First Ladies Day Commission, board member of the Society of Presidential Descendants, great-granddaughter of William Howard Taft
- Robert A. Taft – Senate leader; son of William Howard Taft
- Robert Taft Jr. – congressman 1963–1965, 1967–1971; U.S. senator 1971–1976
- William Howard Taft – 27th president of the United States, chief justice of the Supreme Court
- JD Vance – 50th vice president of the United States, 2025–; U.S. senator, 2023–2025

== Business ==
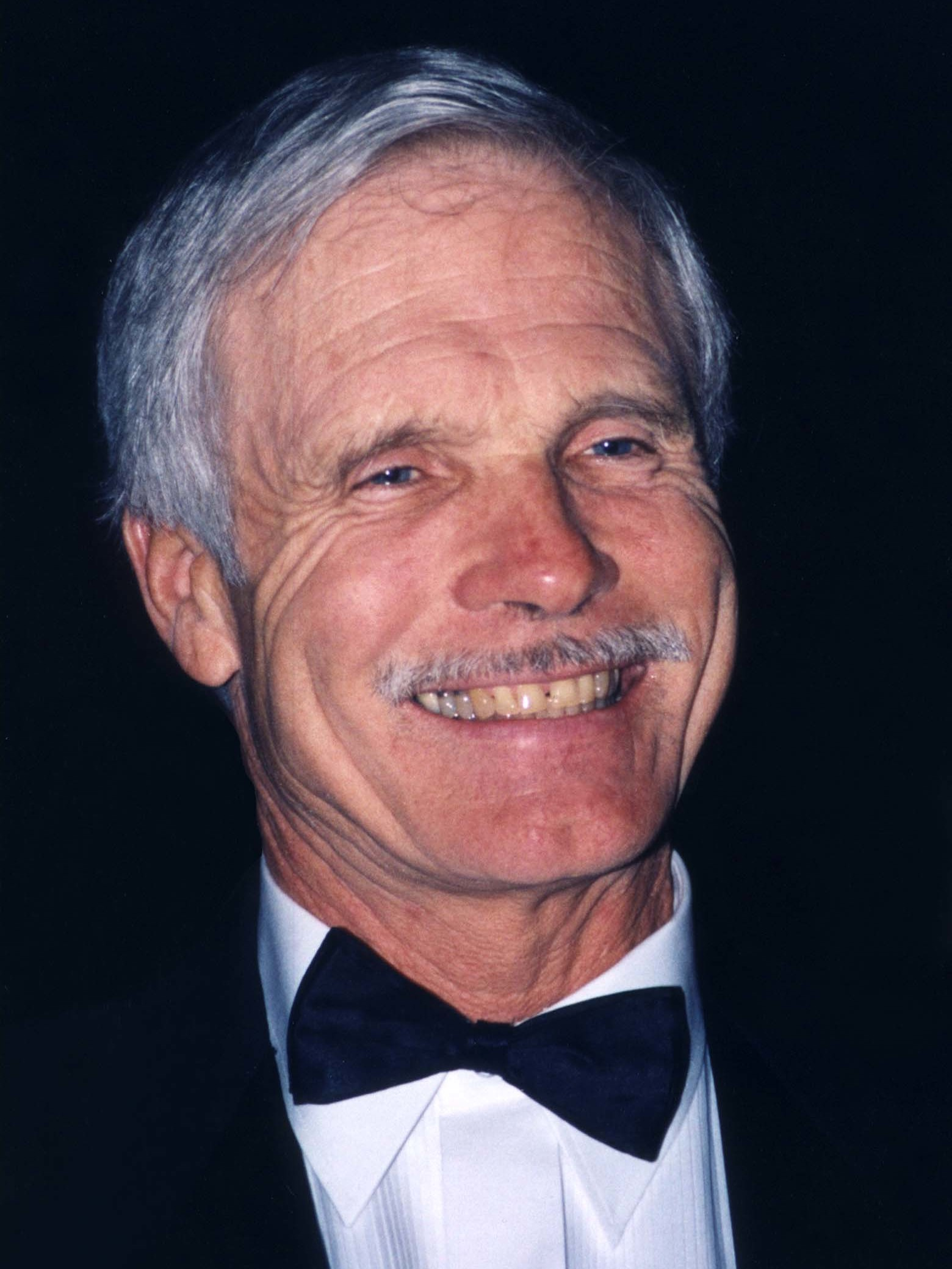
Ted Turner

- Powel Crosley Jr. – inventor and entrepreneur
- Francis L. Dale – lawyer, Cincinnati Reds owner, Republican Party operative
- Maxwell Dane – advertising executive
- James Gamble – co-founder of Procter & Gamble
- Alfred T. Goshorn – businessman, civic booster, founder of the Cincinnati Red Stockings, the first professional baseball team
- Lou Groen – entrepreneur, inventor of the Filet-O-Fish sandwich
- Louise McCarren Herring – leader of the credit union movement
- Charles R. Hook Sr. – steel industrialist
- Ronald Howes – inventor of the Easy-Bake Oven
- Jeffrey R. Immelt – CEO of General Electric
- Charles Keating – banker involved in savings and loan crisis of the 1980s
- Jim Koch – founder of Boston Beer Company
- Bernard Kroger – founder of the Kroger supermarket chain
- Chris Kempczinski – president & CEO of McDonald's Corporation
- James Michael Lafferty – CEO of Fine Hygienic Holding, former regional CEO for Procter & Gamble, Coca-Cola and British American Tobacco; Olympic track and field coach
- Carl Lindner, Jr. – businessman and co-founder of United Dairy Farmers; founder of American Financial Group
- Henry Nicholas – communications technology entrepreneur
- Vivek Ramaswamy – biopharmaceutical entrepreneur, Republican Party presidential and gubernatorial candidate
- Stephen Sanger – former chairman of General Mills
- Marge Schott – women's business pioneer; former owner of the Cincinnati Reds
- Ted Turner – founder of Turner Broadcasting System
- David Uible – businessman and county commissioner
- Douglas A. Warner III – banker

== Science ==
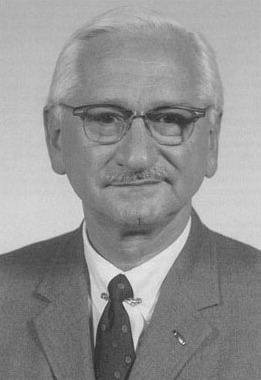
Albert Sabin

- Cleveland Abbe – meteorologist
- C. David Allis – geneticist
- Richard Allison – surgeon general of the Army
- Amanda Bauer – astronomer
- George Robert Carruthers – physicist
- Robin T. Cotton – pediatrician
- Naomi Deutsch – nurse and educator
- Daniel Drake – physician and writer
- Richard S. Hamilton – mathematician
- Henry Heimlich – co-developer of the Heimlich maneuver
- Karl Gordon Henize – NASA astronaut
- Robert Kistner – gynecologist, textbook author
- Thomas Samuel Kuhn – science historian
- Joseph Ransohoff – neurosurgeon
- Tom Rapoport – cell biologist at the Harvard Medical School
- Marion Rawson – archaeologist
- George Rieveschl – inventor of Benadryl
- Rae Robertson-Anderson – biophysicist
- Albert Sabin – discoverer of oral polio vaccine
- David G. Schaeffer – mathematician
- David H. Waldeck – chemist
- Perry Yaney – physicist and professor at the University of Dayton

== Journalism and media ==
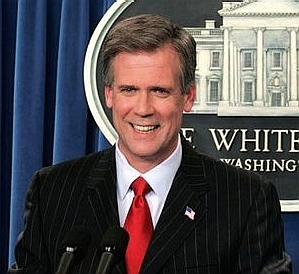
Tony Snow

- Jon Arthur – syndicated radio personality
- Delilah L. Beasley – first African-American woman to be published regularly in a major metropolitan newspaper
- Marty Brennaman – Cincinnati Reds radio play-by-play announcer 1974–2019
- Thom Brennaman – sports broadcaster
- Ric Bucher – sports journalist and television host
- Gary Burbank – radio personality
- Gail Collins – columnist for The New York Times
- Elizabeth Drew – political journalist and author
- Sara Eisen – CNBC news anchor
- Bill Hemmer – Fox News Channel anchor and correspondent; former CNN anchor and reporter
- Mary Coffin Johnson – newspaper publisher, activist
- Joe Kernen – CNBC news anchor
- Dan La Botz – journalist, author and socialist activist
- Ruth Lyons – radio and television personality
- William Maxwell – engraver, printer, publisher of the first newspaper in Cincinnati
- Mike McConnell – syndicated radio talk show host
- John Roll McLean – owner and publisher of The Cincinnati Enquirer and The Washington Post
- Washington McLean – owner and publisher of The Cincinnati Enquirer and The Washington Post
- Erin McPike – White House correspondent for Independent Journal Review, formerly with CNN and NBC News
- David Mendell – journalist and Barack Obama biographer
- Virginia Payne – radio actress
- Wally Phillips – radio personality
- Glenn Ryle – television personality
- Al Schottelkotte – television news anchor and reporter
- Tony Snow – news commentator, White House press secretary for George W. Bush administration
- Dale Sommers – radio personality also known as "the Truckin' Bozo"
- Estelle Sternberger – radio commentator and women's activist
- Linda Vester – Fox News Channel anchor
- Frederick Ziv – television producer and syndication pioneer

== Artists and entertainment ==
=== Acting, motion pictures, and television ===
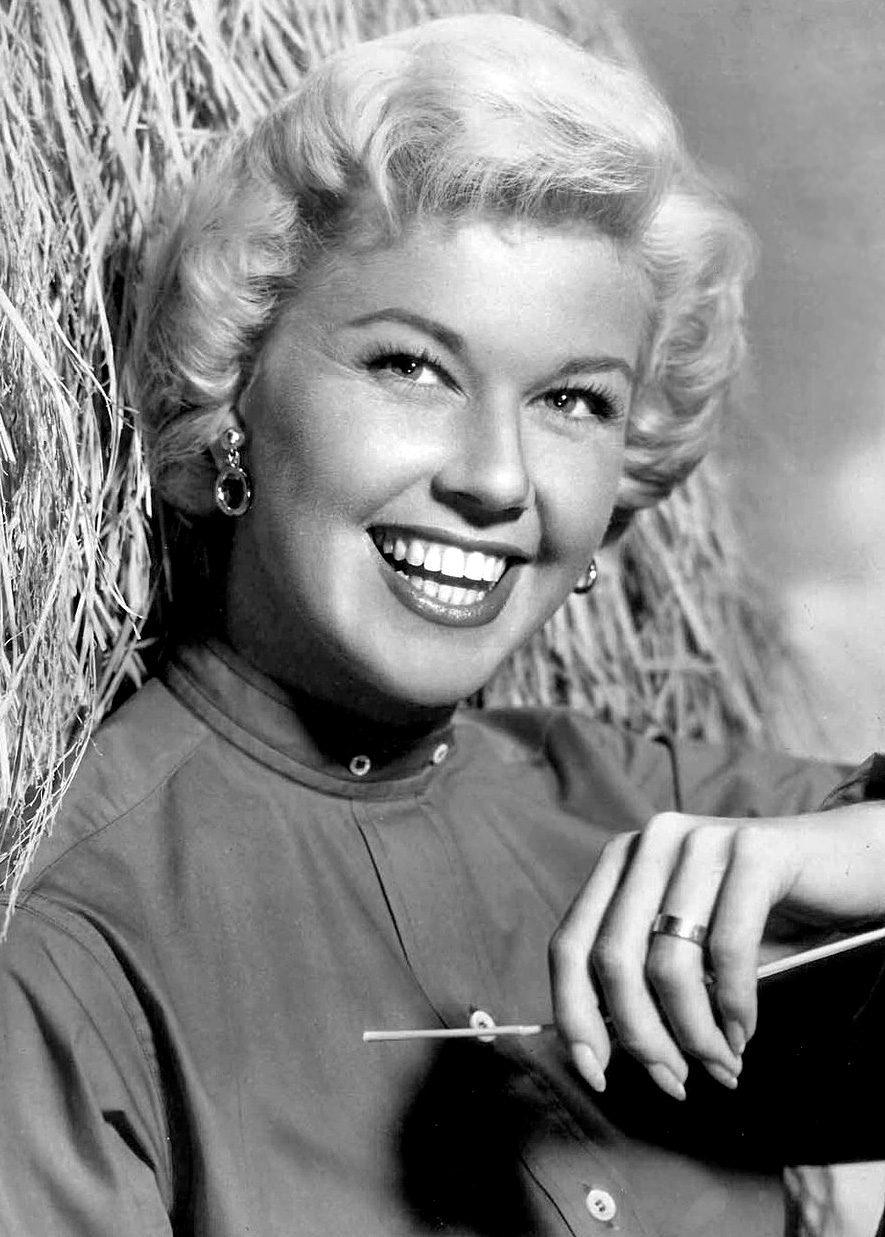
Doris Day

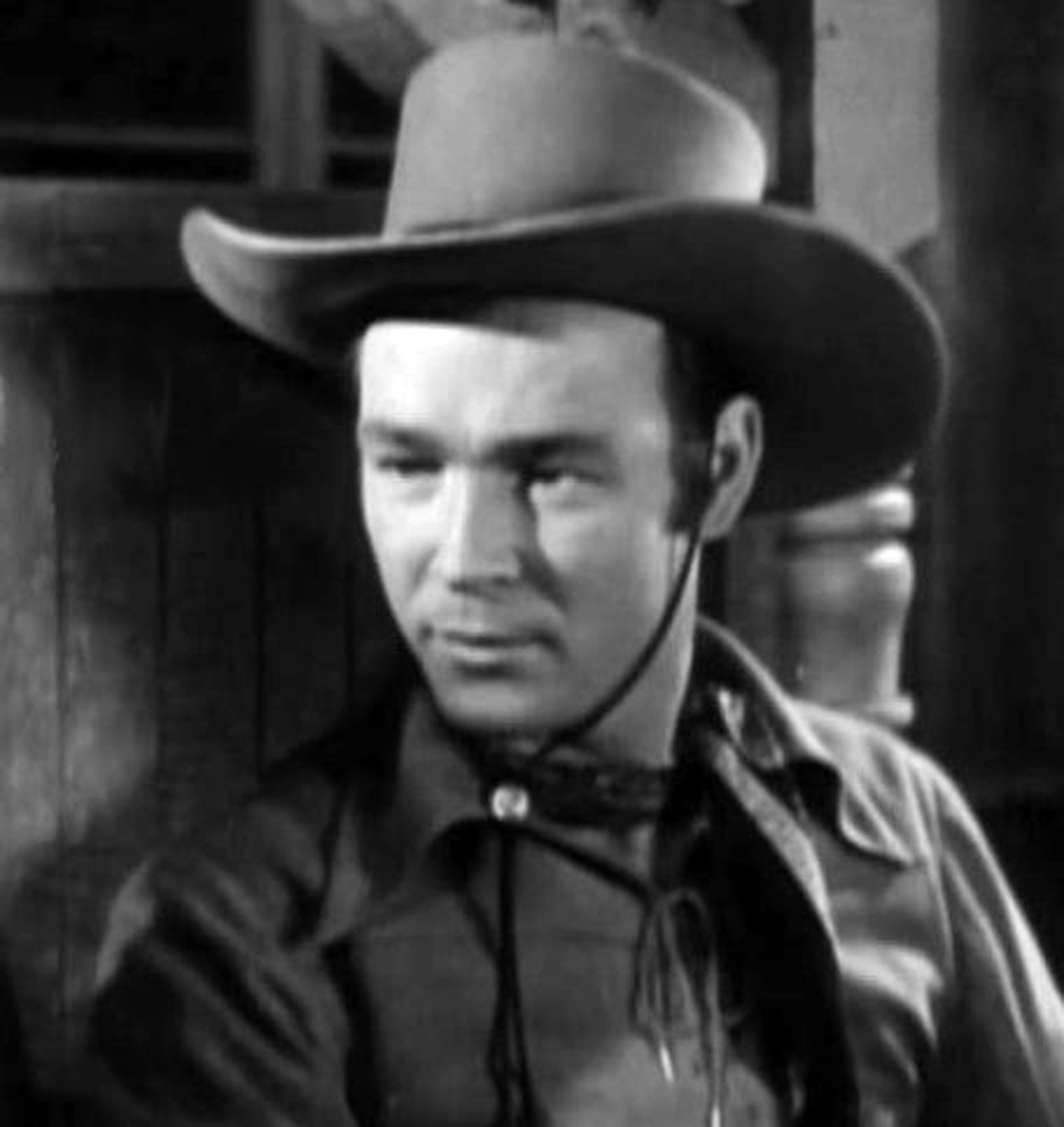
Roy Rogers

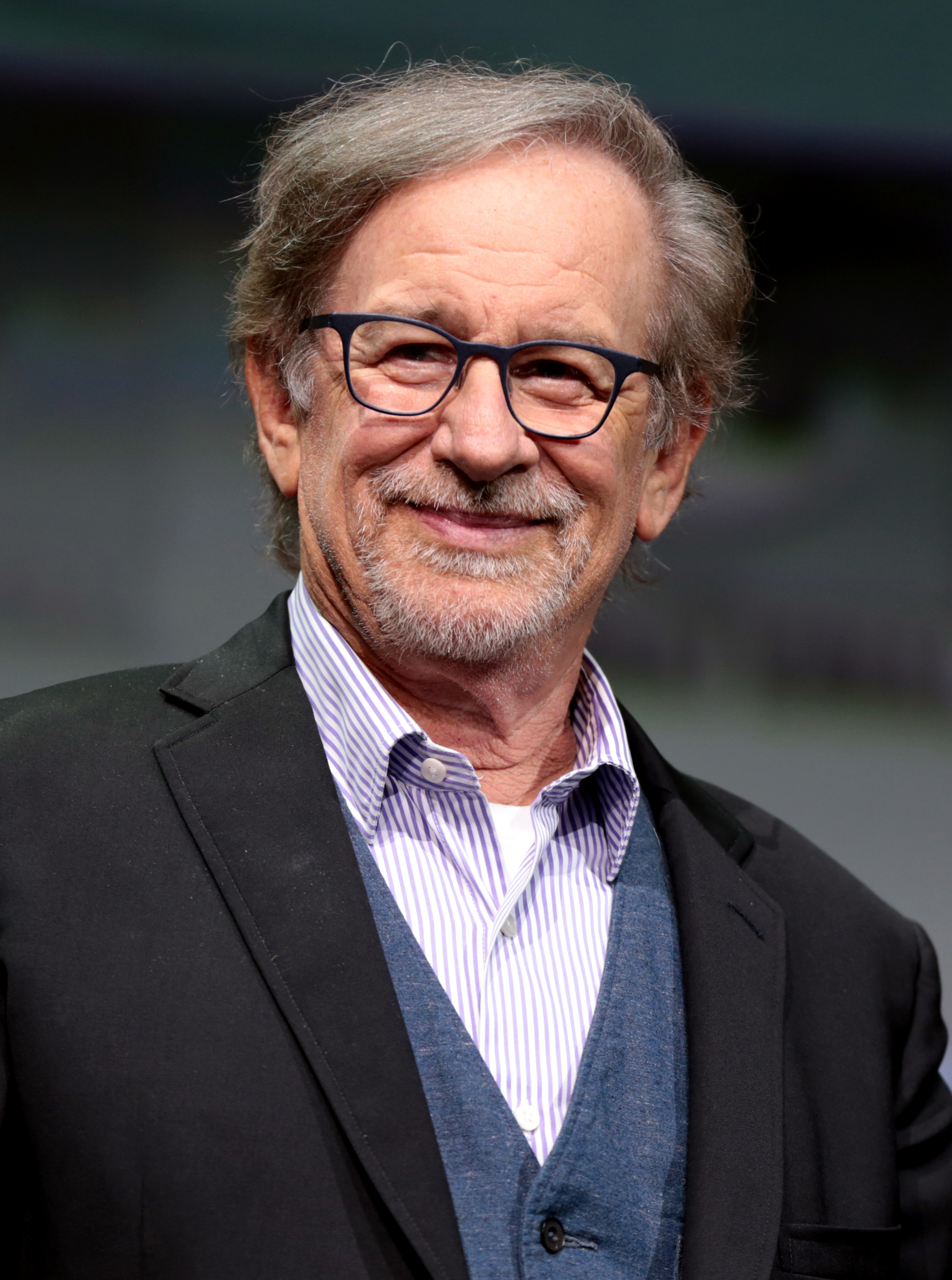
Steven Spielberg

- Kevin Allison – actor, sketch comedian (The State)
- Patti Astor – underground film actress
- Theda Bara – silent film actress
- Powhatan Beaty – American Civil War soldier and stage actor
- Louise Beavers – actress
- Andy Blankenbuehler – dancer and choreographer
- Ron Bohmer – singer and actor
- Mark Boone Junior – actor
- Lee Bowman – film and television actor
- Bob Braun – local television and radio personality
- Don Brodie – actor and director
- Mabel Brownell – stage actress
- Rebecca Budig – soap opera and television actress
- Marty Callner – music video director
- Rocky Carroll – actor (NCIS)
- Marguerite Clark – stage and silent film actress
- Majel Coleman – actress and model
- Walter Connolly – film actor
- Shamika Cotton – actress
- Joel Crothers – actor
- Raymond Garfield Dandridge – poet
- Doris Day – singer and actress
- Gabrielle Dennis – actress (The Game)
- John Diehl – actor
- Carmen Electra (born Tara Leigh Patrick) – actress, singer
- Vera-Ellen – actress and dancer (White Christmas)
- Nikki Glaser – stand-up comedian and actress
- Julie Hagerty – model and actress (Airplane!)
- Pauline Hall – stage actress and dancer
- Porter Hall – actor (Miracle on 34th Street)
- Maurice Hegeman – Broadway musical actor, lyricist, and playwright
- Libby Holman – torch singer and actress
- IShowSpeed, real name Darren Watkins Jr. – YouTube personality, streamer, rapper, and songwriter
- Arthur V. Johnson – silent film actor and director
- Noah Keen – actor
- Dagney Kerr – actress
- Ida Koverman – Metro-Goldwyn-Mayer film executive
- Dorothy Layton – actress
- KiKi Layne – actress
- Hal Le Roy – dancer, singer, stage actor
- Hudson Leick – actress
- Edward LeSaint – silent film actor and director
- Marcia Lewis – actress
- Vicki Lewis – actress (NewsRadio)
- Floriana Lima – actress
- Kelley Mack – actress
- Gina Malo – actress
- Irene Manning – actress and singer
- Jack Manning – actor
- Markiplier, real name Mark Edward Fischbach – YouTube personality
- Eve McVeagh – actress
- Benjamin S. Mears – actor and playwright
- Fanny Midgley – silent film actress
- J. Madison Wright Morris – actress and model
- Kathryn Morris – actress (Cold Case)
- Sydney Morton – actor
- Luke Null – comedian, cast member on Saturday Night Live
- Gary Owen – stand-up comedian and actor
- Jo Ellen Pellman – actress
- Richard M. Powell – television and film screenwriter
- Tyrone Power – actor (The Mark of Zorro, Witness for the Prosecution)
- Roy Rogers – actor and singer, iconic western film star
- Bonnie Rotten – porn star
- Brenda Scott – actress
- Tom Segura – comedian
- Iva Shepard – silent film actress
- Hal Sparks – actor and comedian
- Steven Spielberg – Oscar-winning film director
- Jerry Springer – mayor of Cincinnati, talk show host (born in London, of Austrian parents)
- Galadriel Stineman – actress
- Brette Taylor – actress and singer-songwriter
- Evelyn Venable – actress
- Daniel von Bargen – actor
- Robert J. Wilke – actor
- Katt Williams – stand-up comedian and actor
- Rudy Wurlitzer – screenwriter

=== Music ===
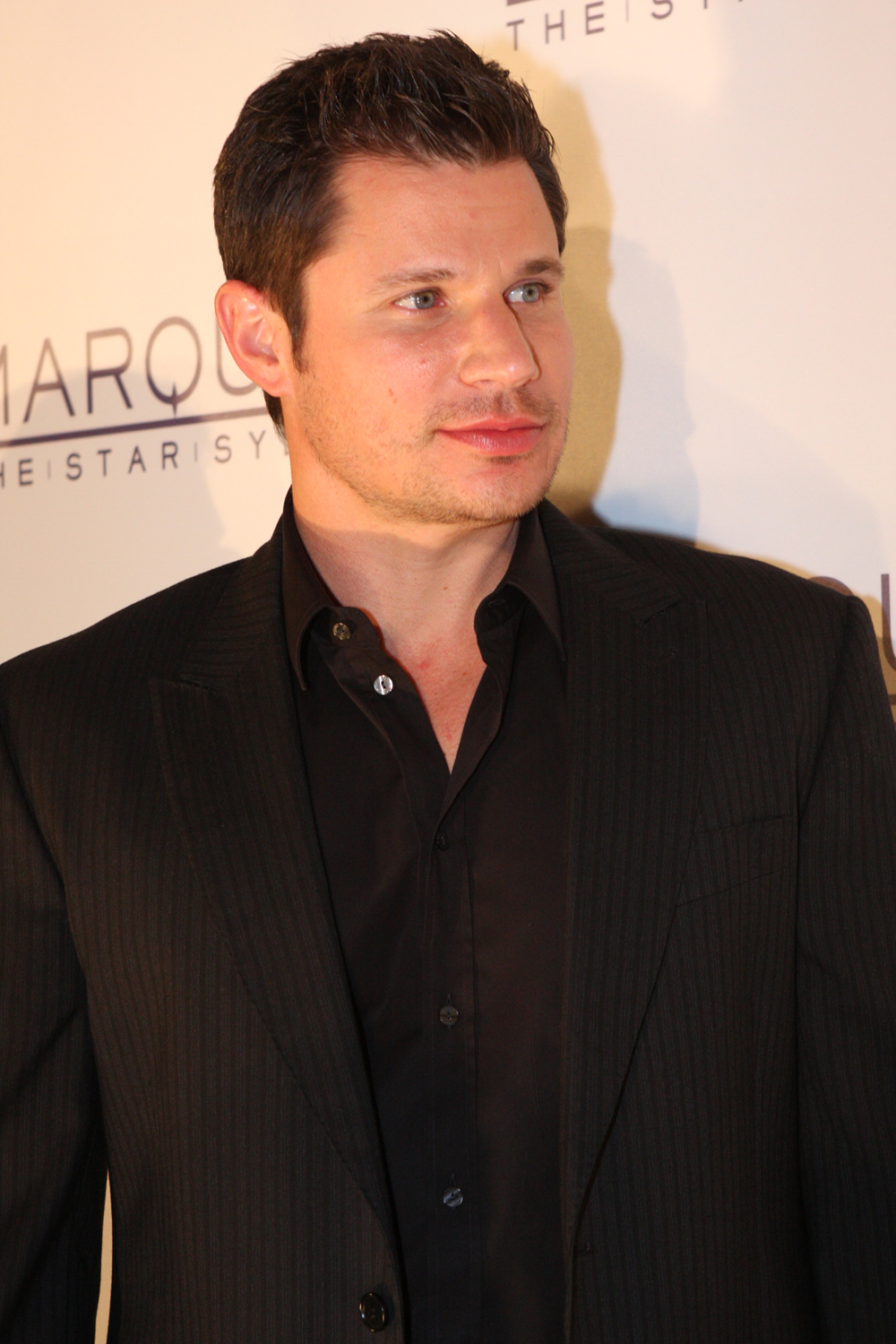
Nick Lachey

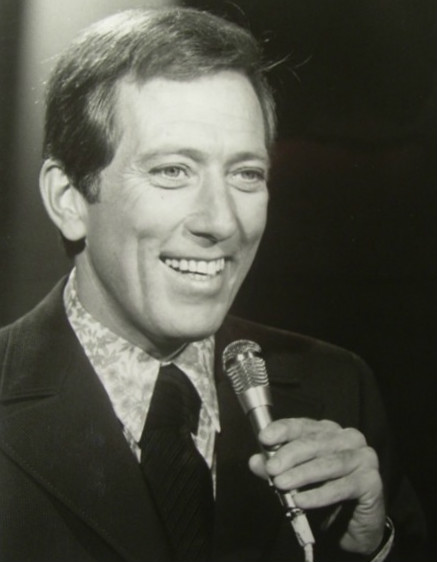
Andy Williams

- Sudan Archives – violinist and R&B singer
- Marty Balin – founder and original lead singer of Jefferson Airplane
- Matt Berninger – lead singer of The National
- Andy Biersack – rock singer (Black Veil Brides)
- Boom Bip – electronic musician
- Bobby Borchers – country music singer-songwriter
- Mia Carruthers – singer-songwriter
- Mel Carter – R&B singer
- Bootsy Collins – Parliament Funkadelic funk bass player
- Danny Cox – folk singer/songwriter
- Gustav Dannreuther – violinist and conductor
- Carl Dobkins, Jr. – rockabilly singer
- Fat Jon – hip hop producer
- Frank Foster – jazz saxophonist, composer and arranger
- H-Bomb Ferguson – jump blues singer
- Reed Ghazala – electronic musician and instrument builder
- Emma Heckle – soprano
- Hi-Tek – rapper and producer
- Steve Kipner – songwriter ("Let's Get Physical")
- Drew Lachey – 98 Degrees member, winner of Dancing With The Stars
- Nick Lachey – lead singer of 98 Degrees
- James Levine – conductor
- Arlo McKinley – singer-songwriter
- Nicole C. Mullen – songwriter and choreographer
- Naked Cowboy – busker
- Curtis Peagler – jazz saxophonist
- Tyler Ramsey – guitarist for Band of Horses
- Antonio "L.A." Reid – record executive
- Sheldon Reynolds – R&B guitarist
- George Russell – jazz pianist and composer
- Mamie Smith – blues singer
- Constance Cochnower Virtue – composer and organist
- Andy Williams – pop singer
- Philippe Wynne – lead singer for The Spinners

==== Groups ====
- Afghan Whigs – rock band
- Ass Ponys – rock band
- Beneath the Sky – metalcore band
- Blessid Union of Souls – rock band
- Buffalo Killers – rock band
- The Casinos – doo-wop group
- The Deele – R&B/Soul group
- Heartless Bastards – indie rock band
- The Isley Brothers – R&B/soul group
- The National – indie rock band
- Otis Williams and the Charms – doo-wop vocal group
- Over the Rhine – rock band
- Pomegranates – indie rock band
- Pure Prairie League – pop/country band
- RyanDan – dual operatic singer/gospel
- The Students – doo-wop group
- Walk the Moon – indie-rock band
- Wussy – indie rock band
- Yankee Grey – country band

=== Authors ===
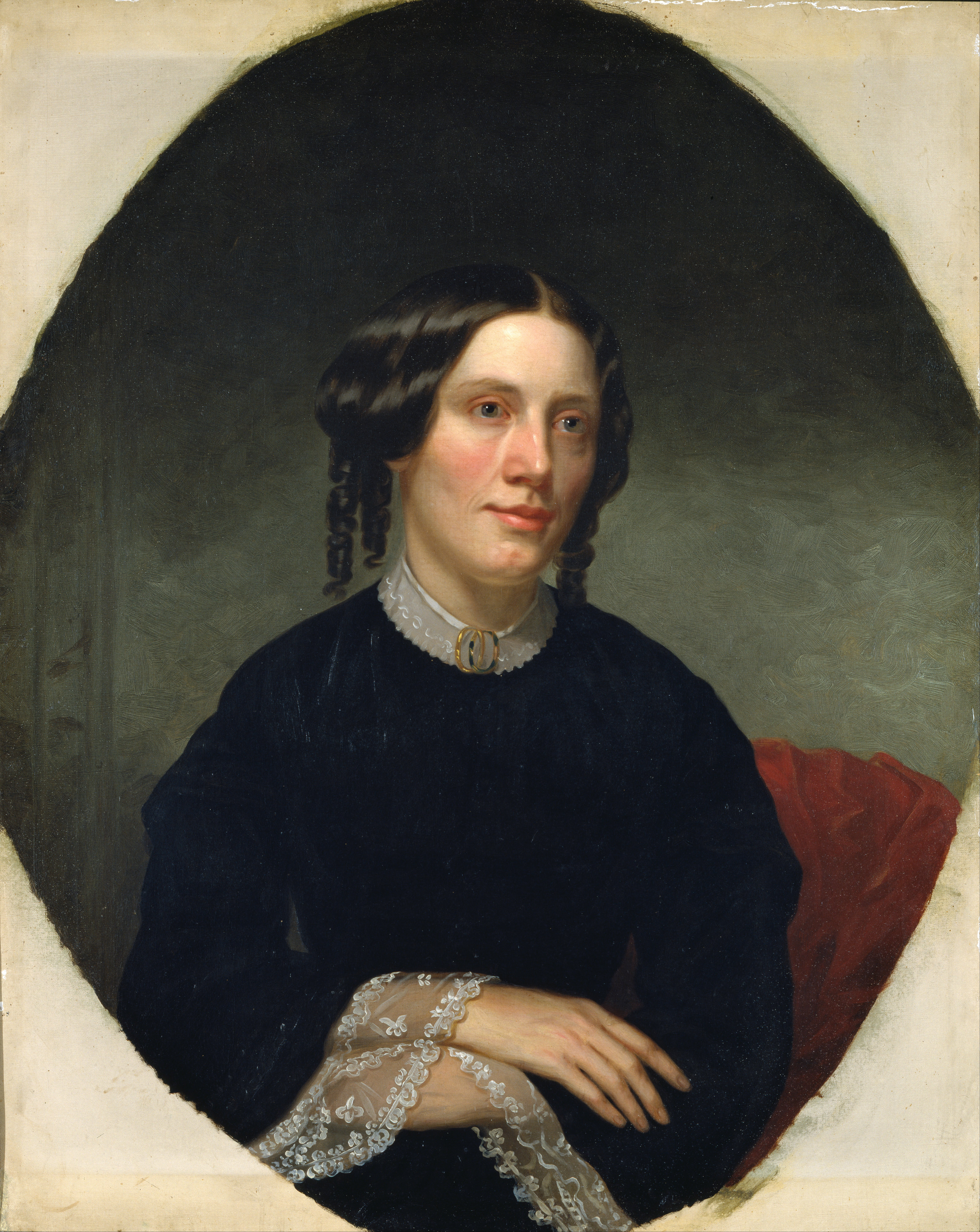
Harriet Beecher Stowe

- Karen Ackerman – children's author
- Melissa Elizabeth Riddle Banta (1834–1907) – poet
- David Bell – novelist
- Thomas Berger – author
- Eva Best – story writer, poet, music composer, dramatist
- Christopher Bollen – novelist
- Fredric Brown – author
- Michael Cunningham – novelist (The Hours)
- Sara Rowsey Foley – biographer
- Nikki Giovanni – poet and author
- Tonya Ingram – poet, disability activist, mental health advocate
- Kenneth Koch – New York School poet
- Tim Lucas – film critic, novelist, author
- William Holmes McGuffey – educator, author of McGuffey Readers
- David Quammen – science and travel writer
- Susan Elizabeth Phillips – author
- Mike Resnick – Hugo Award-winning science fiction writer
- Curtis Sittenfeld – novelist
- Henry Thew Stevenson – academic and writer
- Harriet Beecher Stowe – author and abolitionist
- Jonathan Valin – novelist
- Edmund White – author

=== Visual artists ===
Snow in New York by Robert Henri

- James Presley Ball – photographer and abolitionist
- Karl Bissinger – photographer
- Robert Frederick Blum – lithographer
- Jim Borgman – Pulitzer Prize-winning editorial cartoonist
- Jim Dine – pop artist
- Robert S. Duncanson – painter and muralist
- Frank Duveneck – figure and portrait painter
- Elliot Earls – graphic designer
- Alfred Oscar Elzner – architect
- Suzanne Farrell – ballerina
- William H. Fry – Aesthetic movement wood carver and gilder
- Harry Hake – architect
- Samuel Hannaford – architect, designer of Cincinnati's Music Hall
- Charley Harper – wildlife artist
- Robert Henri – painter, leader of the Ashcan School movement
- Ida Holterhoff Holloway – painter
- Caroline Augusta Lord – painter
- Mary Louise McLaughlin – ceramic painter and studio potter
- Lewis Henry Meakin – American Impressionist painter
- Henry Mosler – painter
- Alfred B. Mullett – architect
- Charles Henry Niehaus – sculptor
- Thomas Satterwhite Noble – painter
- Elizabeth Nourse – painter
- Edward Henry Potthast – American Impressionist painter
- Hiram Powers – sculptor
- John Ruthven – painter of wildlife
- Sara Sax – ceramic painter
- Sheida Soleimani – Iranian-American multidisciplinary artist
- Lilly Martin Spencer – painter
- Maria Longworth Storer – founder of the Rookwood Pottery Company
- Adolph Strauch – landscape architect
- John Robinson Tait – landscape painter
- Tony Tasset – contemporary artist
- Mary Lee Tate – African-American painter, educator
- John Henry Twachtman – impressionist landscape painter
- Edward Charles Volkert – American Impressionist painter
- Tom Wesselmann – pop artist

== Sports ==
=== Baseball ===
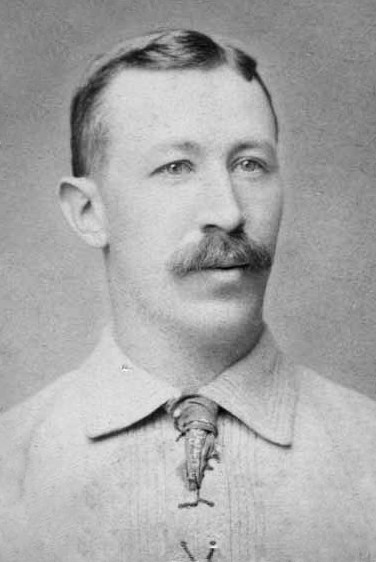
Buck Ewing

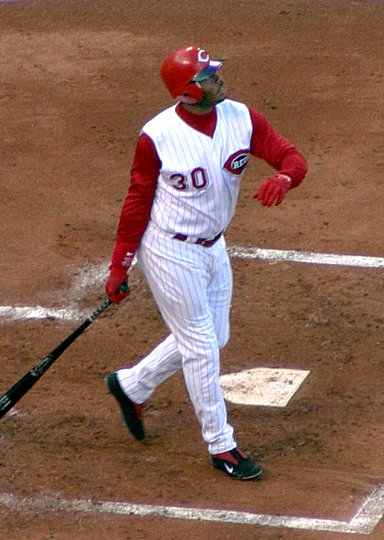
Ken Griffey Jr.

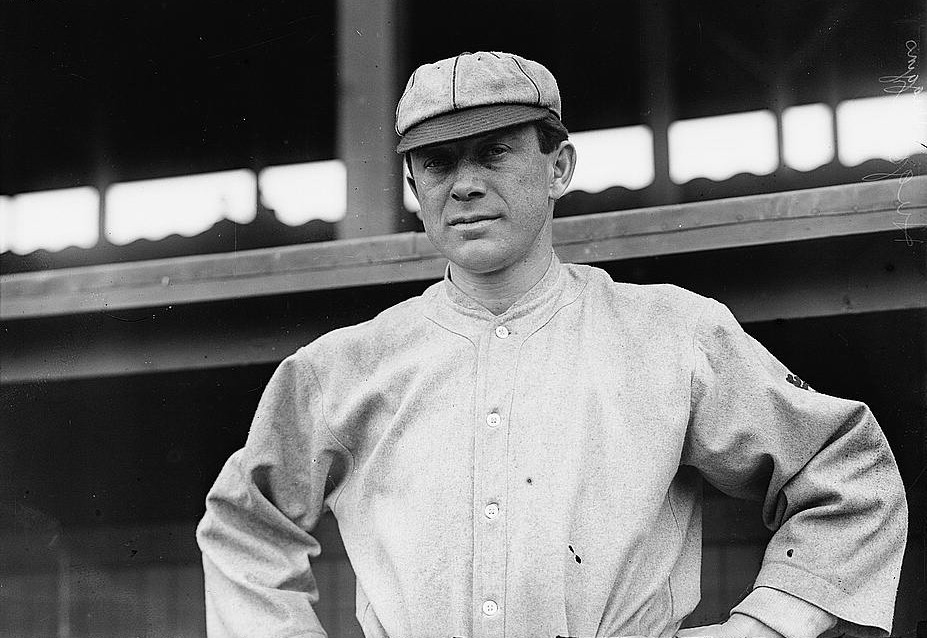
Miller Huggins

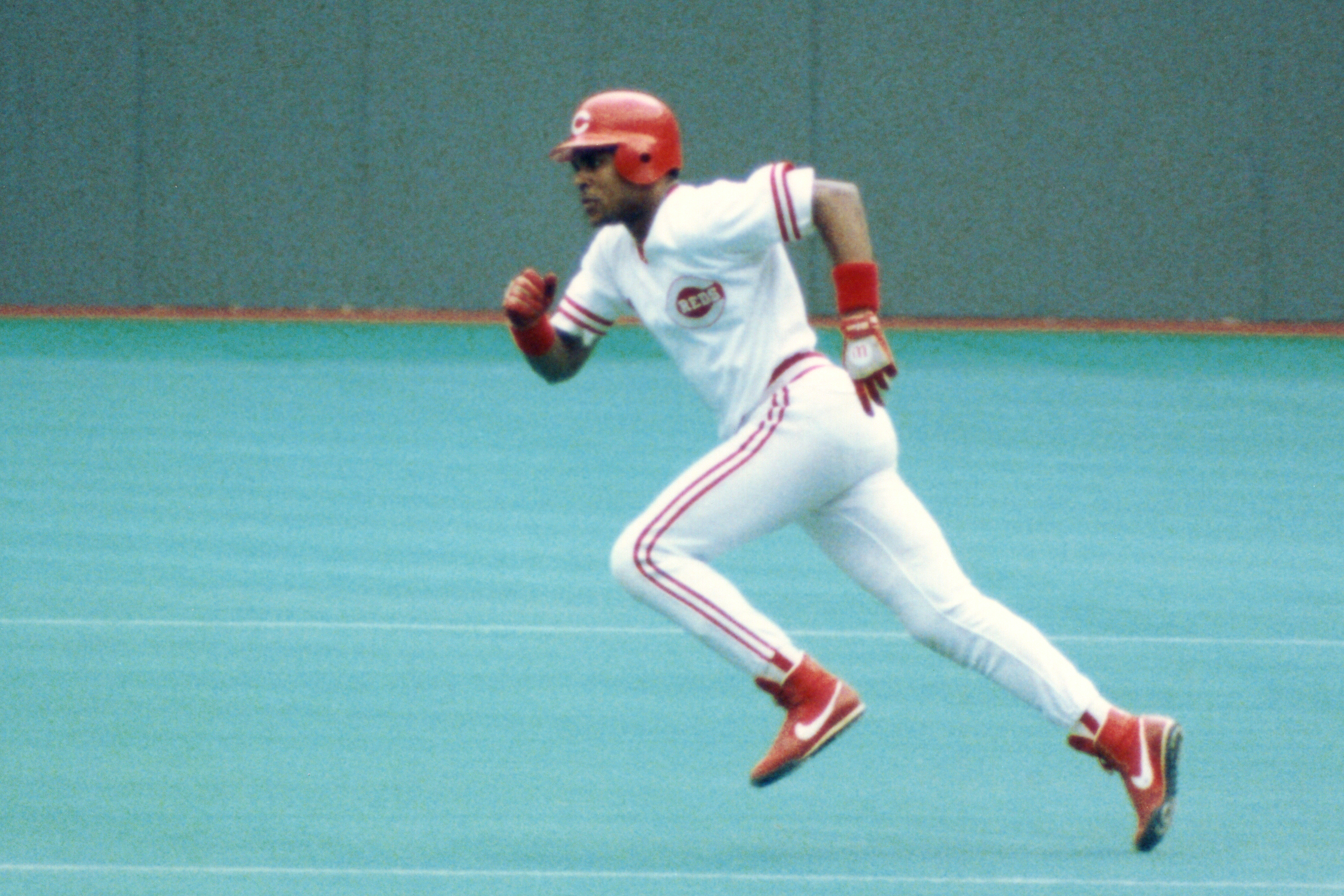
Barry Larkin

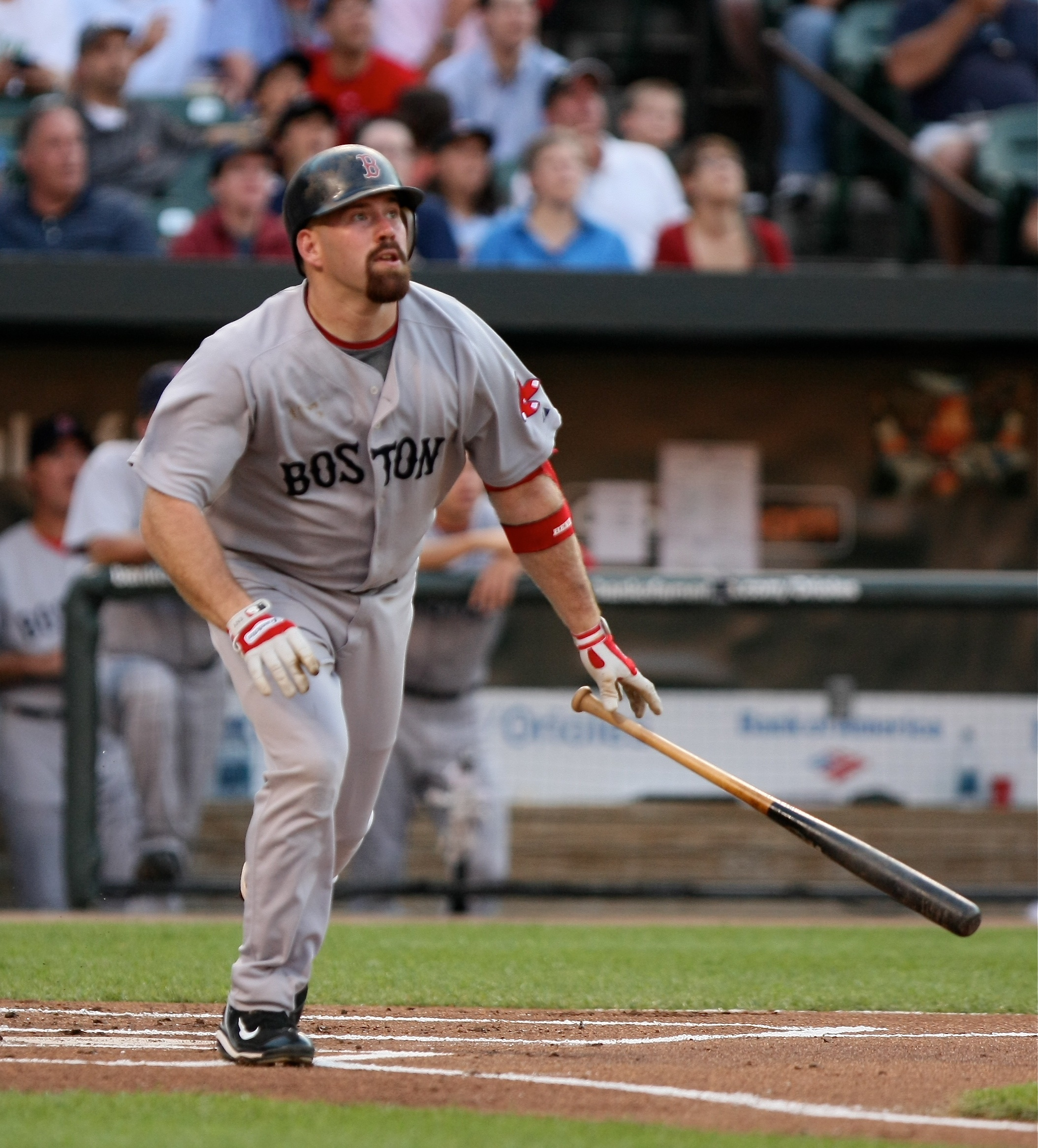
Kevin Youkilis

- Ethan Allen – MLB player, coach at Yale University
- Nick Altrock – MLB pitcher
- Charlie Armbruster – MLB catcher
- Skeeter Barnes – MLB utility player
- Al Bashang – MLB outfielder
- Buddy Bell – MLB third baseman and manager
- Charlie Bell – MLB pitcher
- David Bell – MLB third baseman and Cincinnati Reds manager
- Frank Bell – MLB player
- Mike Bell – MLB third baseman
- Ethan Blackaby – MLB outfielder
- Jim Bolger – MLB outfielder
- Daryl Boston – MLB outfielder
- Jack Boyle – MLB player
- Jimmy Boyle – MLB catcher
- Andrew Brackman – MLB pitcher
- Ed Brinkman – MLB player
- Jim Brosnan – MLB pitcher, author of The Long Season and Pennant Race
- Moe Burtschy – MLB pitcher
- Flea Clifton – MLB pitcher
- Bob Daughters – MLB player
- Zach Day – MLB pitcher
- Dory Dean – MLB pitcher
- Drew Denson – MLB first baseman
- Red Dooin – MLB player and manager
- Bill Doran – MLB second baseman
- Richard Dotson – MLB pitcher
- Buck Ewing – Hall of Fame catcher and manager
- Bill Faul – MLB pitcher
- Tom Flanigan – MLB pitcher
- Danny Friend – MLB pitcher
- Charlie Grant – Negro leagues second baseman
- Bob Gilks – MLB player
- Charlie Gould – National League baseball player
- Ken Griffey Jr. – MLB outfielder, Baseball Hall of Famer (born in Donora, Pennsylvania, but grew up in Cincinnati)
- Tommy Griffith – MLB outfielder
- Heinie Groh – MLB third baseman
- Josh Harrison – MLB third baseman
- Dan Hayden – Miami University (OH) baseball coach
- August Herrmann – Cincinnati Reds president, 1903–1920
- Johnny Hodapp – MLB infielder
- Miller Huggins – MLB player; Hall of Fame manager for the New York Yankees
- Tom Hume – MLB pitcher
- Larry Jacobus – MLB pitcher
- Betsy Jochum – All-American Girls Professional Baseball League player
- David Justice – MLB player
- Dorothy Kamenshek – All-American Girls Professional Baseball League player
- Scott Klingenbeck – MLB pitcher
- Al Lakeman – MLB player
- Margie Lang – All-American Girls Professional Baseball League player
- Barry Larkin – MLB shortstop, Baseball Hall of Famer
- Stephen Larkin – MLB first baseman
- Charlie Leesman – MLB pitcher
- Dick LeMay – MLB pitcher
- Jim Leyritz – MLB catcher
- Bill Long – MLB pitcher
- Garry Maddox – MLB outfielder
- Art Mahaffey – MLB pitcher
- Ralph Miller – MLB pitcher
- Bobby Moore – MLB player, currently a coach for the Atlanta Braves organization
- Red Munson – MLB catcher
- Tim Naehring – MLB player
- Charles Murphy – sportswriter, owner of the Chicago Cubs
- Bob Nieman – MLB player
- Russ Nixon – MLB player and manager (born in Cleves, a suburb of Cincinnati)
- Ron Oester – MLB player
- Jayhawk Owens – MLB player
- Dave Parker – MLB outfielder, Baseball Hall of Famer (born in Grenada, Mississippi, grew up in Cincinnati)
- George Pechiney – MLB pitcher
- Dave Pember – MLB pitcher
- Shannon Penn – MLB designated hitter
- Eduardo Pérez – MLB player; son of Tony Pérez
- Jack Pfiester – MLB pitcher
- Cy Pfirman – MLB umpire
- Icicle Reeder – MLB outfielder
- Tuffy Rhodes – MLB and Japanese player
- Billy Riley – MLB player outfielder
- Pete Rose – All-Star MLB player, holds record for most hits in a career
- Pete Rose Jr. – minor league baseball player
- Jeff Russell – MLB pitcher
- Scott Sauerbeck – MLB pitcher
- Admiral Schlei – MLB catcher
- Jimmy Shevlin – MLB first baseman
- Jake Stenzel – MLB outfielder
- Eric Surkamp – MLB pitcher
- Brent Suter – MLB pitcher
- Pat Tabler – MLB player and baseball analyst
- Marie Wegman – All-American Girls Professional Baseball League player
- Alex Wimmers – MLB pitcher
- Jimmy Wynn – MLB outfielder
- George Yeager – MLB catcher
- Kevin Youkilis – All-Star MLB first and third baseman
- Don Zimmer – MLB player and manager

=== Basketball ===
- DJ Brewton (born 2000) – basketball player in the Israeli Basketball Premier League
- Rick Calloway – NBA player
- Kwan Cheatham – basketball player in the Israel Basketball Premier League
- Semaj Christon – Xavier University and NBA Development League player
- Mick Cronin – UCLA and University of Cincinnati basketball coach
- Derrek Dickey – NBA player and analyst
- Josh Duncan – Xavier University and European league player
- Robin Freeman – 1955 and 1956 All-American at Ohio State
- Yancy Gates – player for Ironi Nahariya of the Israeli Premier League
- Tyrone Hill – Xavier University and NBA player
- Brandon Hunter – NBA player
- Pat Kelsey – Charleston and Louisville head coach
- Shane Larkin – plays in the Turkish Basketbol Süper Ligi for Anadolu Efes S.K., son of Barry Larkin
- Mike Mathis – NBA referee
- Kelsey Mitchell – 2018 Big Ten Women's Basketball Player of the Year for Ohio State
- Louis Orr – NBA player and college coach
- LaSalle Thompson – NBA player
- Bob Wiesenhahn – NBA player
- Devin Williams – West Virginia and NBA G League player

=== Boxing ===
- Adrien Broner – light welterweight boxer
- Ezzard Charles – heavyweight champion boxer
- Don Elbaum – middleweight boxer and boxing promoter
- George Foster – featherweight boxer
- Freddie Miller – featherweight boxer
- Aaron Pryor – world light welterweight champion boxer
- Brad Rone – journeyman boxer who died in the ring
- Ronald Siler – 2004 Olympic flyweight boxer
- Wallace Smith – lightweight boxer
- Ricardo Williams – 2000 Olympic light welterweight silver medalist boxer

=== Football ===
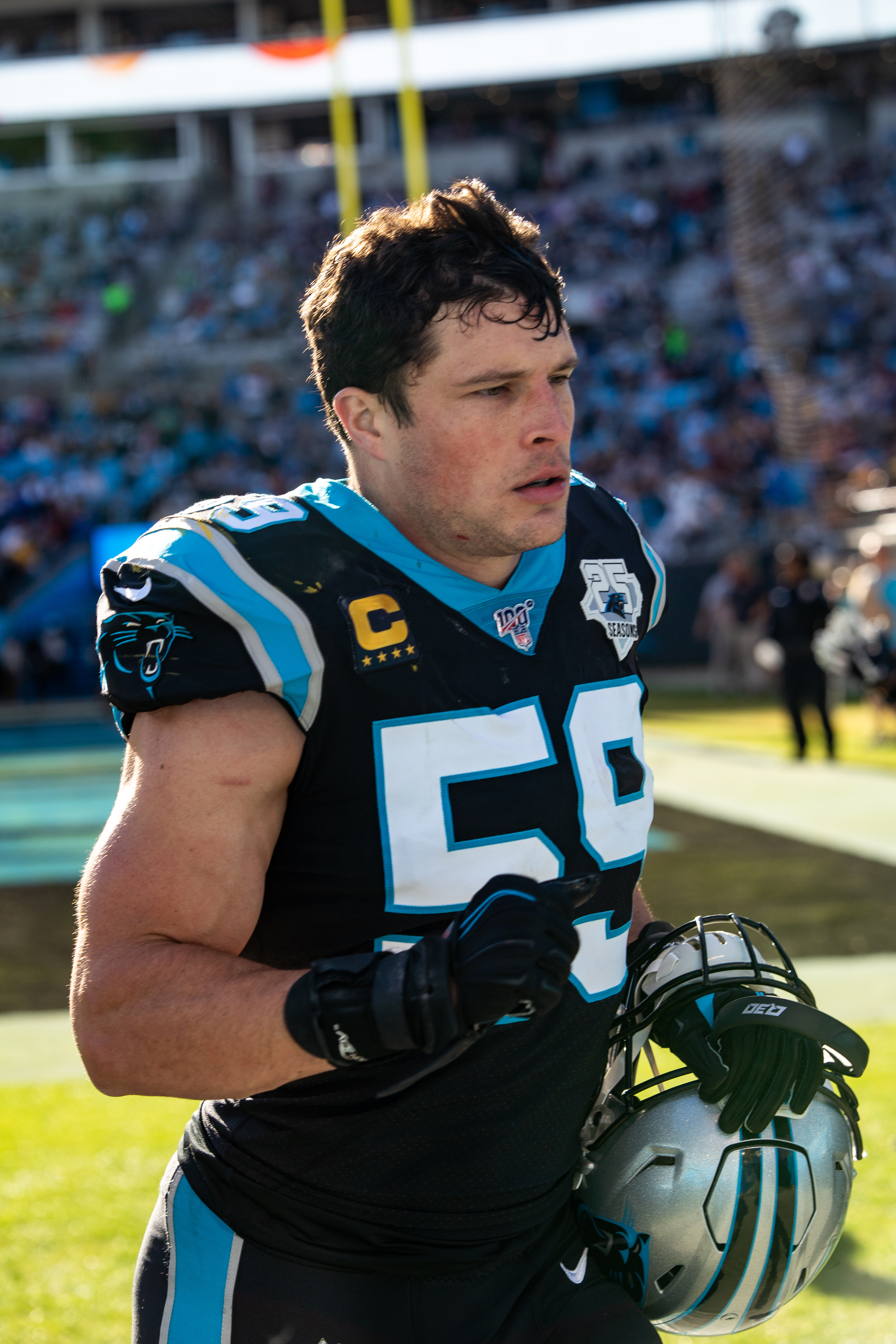
Luke Kuechly

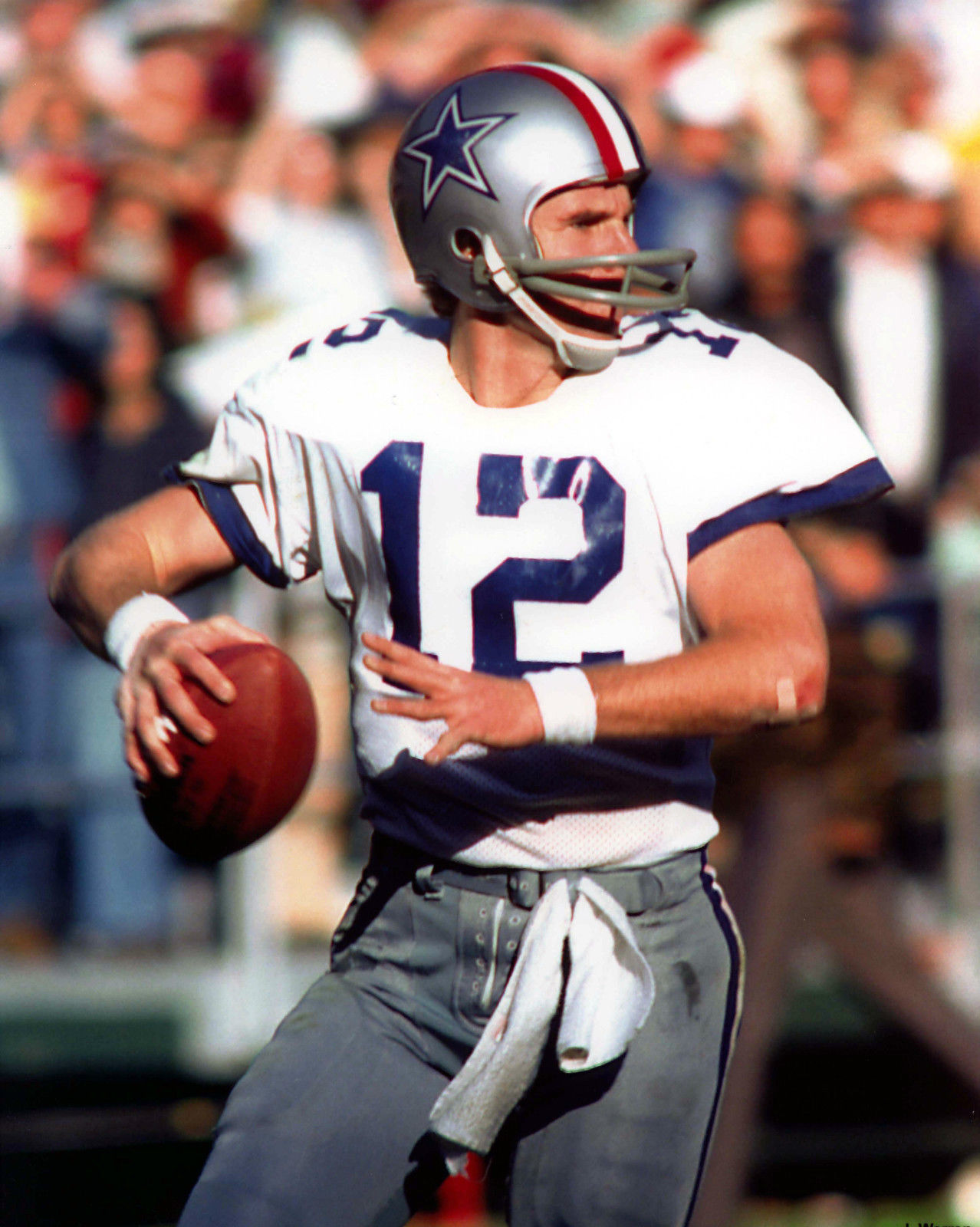
Roger Staubach

- Alex Albright – NFL linebacker
- Darren Anderson – NFL cornerback
- Mel Anthony – Michigan and CFL fullback; 1965 Rose Bowl MVP
- B.J. Askew – NFL fullback
- Darren Barnett – NFL cornerback
- Ron Beagle – College Football Hall of Fame end for Navy
- Ed Biles – NFL Houston Oilers head coach, 1981–1983
- Rocky Boiman – Notre Dame and NFL linebacker, radio host
- Vaughn Booker – NFL defensive end
- Jim Boyle – NFL offensive tackle
- Dante Brown – NFL running back
- Tyrone Brown – NFL and CFL wide receiver
- Tank Carradine – Florida State and NFL defensive tackle
- Brent Celek – NFL tight end
- Garrett Celek – NFL tight end
- Robert Cobb – NFL defensive end
- Shane Curry – NFL defensive end; murdered in 1992
- Dane Dastillung – American football player
- Jerome Davis – NFL nose tackle
- Jerry Doerger – NFL center
- Mark Elder – Eastern Kentucky college football head coach
- Greg Frey – Ohio State quarterback
- Bob Fry – NFL offensive lineman
- Dave Frye – NFL linebacker
- Bob Goodridge – NFL wide receiver
- Dick Gordon – Pro Bowl wide receiver
- Carlton Gray – NFL cornerback
- Maurice Harvey – NFL safety
- Clint Haslerig – Michigan and NFL wide receiver
- Don Hasselbeck – NFL tight end
- Joel Heath – NFL defensive tackle
- Robert Hoernschemeyer – NFL running back
- Jack Hoffman – NFL player
- Sam Hubbard – defensive end for the Ohio State Buckeyes and the Cincinnati Bengals
- Kevin Huber – NFL punter
- Tony Hunter – Notre Dame and NFL tight end
- Melvin Johnson – NFL safety
- Paris Johnson Jr. – Ohio State offensive lineman
- Steve Junker – NFL tight end
- Eric Kresser – NFL quarterback
- Luke Kuechly – NFL linebacker; 2013 NFL Defensive Player of the Year, Pro Football Hall of Fame
- David Long Jr. – NFL linebacker
- Dante Love – Ball State wide receiver
- Greg Mancz – NFL center
- Napoleon McCallum – College Football Hall of Fame running back for Navy
- Jake McQuaide – Los Angeles Rams Pro Bowl Long snapper
- Brandon Miree – NFL fullback
- Michael Muñoz – Tennessee offensive tackle
- Ray Nolting – NFL running back, University of Cincinnati football coach
- Andrew Norwell – NFL offensive lineman, 2017 All-Pro
- Tom O'Brien – North Carolina State Wolfpack football head coach
- Antwan Peek – NFL linebacker
- George Ratterman – football player
- Reggie Redding – NFL offensive lineman
- Ike Reese – NFL linebacker and radio host
- J. Burton Rix – SMU and Miami (FL) head football coach
- Kyle Rudolph – Minnesota Vikings tight end
- Marcus Rush – NFL linebacker
- Abdul Salaam – NFL defensive tackle
- Greg Scruggs – NFL linebacker
- Tyler Sheehan – NFL and indoor football quarterback
- Ed Shuttlesworth – Michigan and CFL fullback
- Chris Smith – NFL running back
- Ryan Stanchek – NFL offensive lineman
- Ralph Staub – Cincinnati Bearcats football player and coach
- Roger Staubach – Heisman Trophy-winning Pro Football Hall of Fame quarterback
- Milt Stegall – NFL and CFL wide receiver, Canadian Football Hall of Famer
- Greg Stemrick – NFL cornerback
- Zach Strief – NFL offensive lineman
- Matt Tennant – NFL offensive lineman
- Steve Tensi – NFL quarterback
- Brian Townsend – NFL linebacker
- Spencer Ware – NFL running back
- Adolphus Washington – Ohio State and NFL defensive tackle
- Russell Wilson – NFL quarterback and Super Bowl XLVIII Champion
- DeShawn Wynn – NFL running back

=== Soccer ===
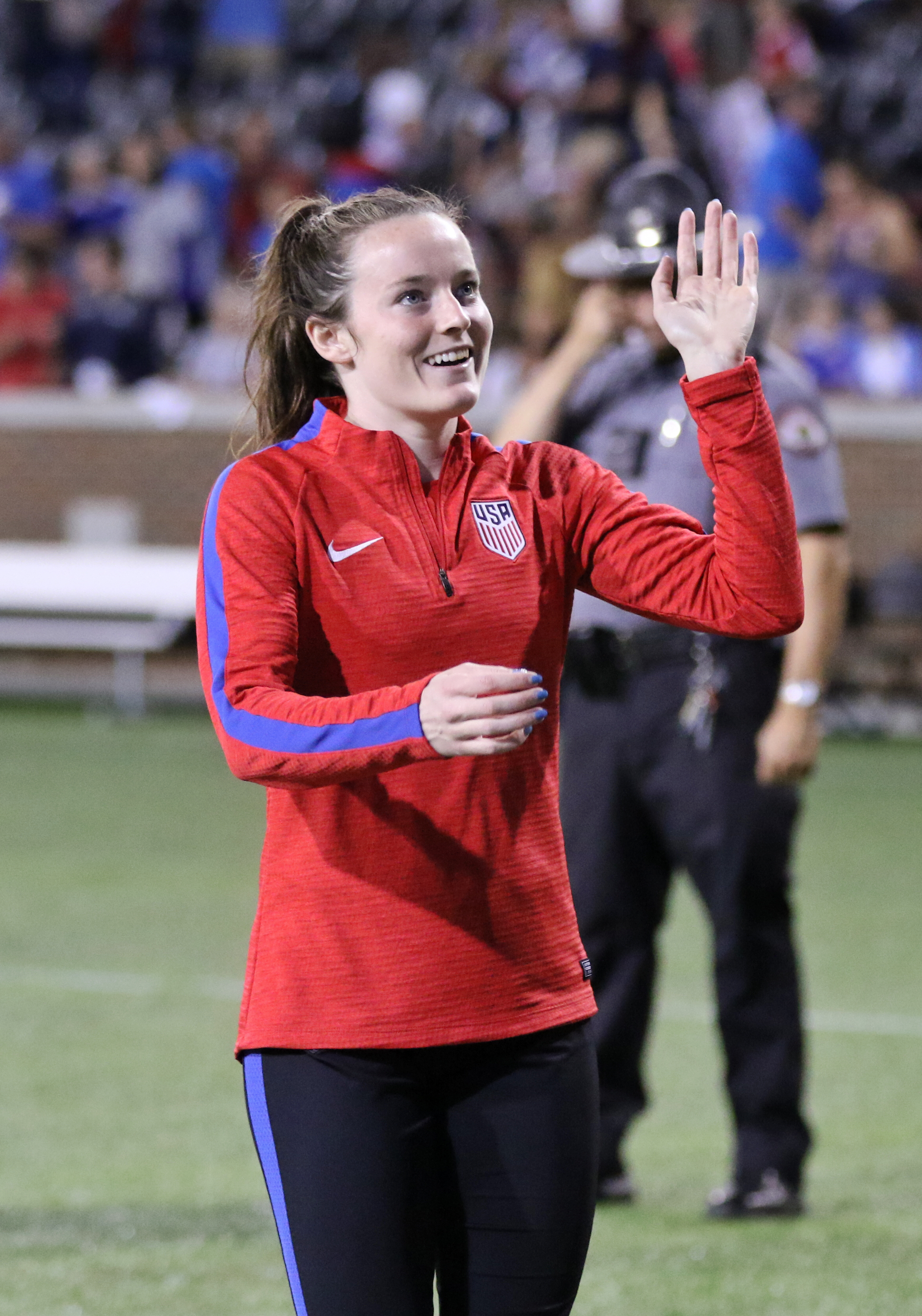
Rose Lavelle

- Austin Berry – defender
- Danielle Borgman – defender who represented the United States woman's national team
- Marc Burch – defender
- Bayley Feist – midfielder
- Nick Hagglund – defender
- Tori Huster – midfielder and president of the National Women's Soccer League Players Association
- Aubrey Kingsbury – goalkeeper who represented the United States woman's national team
- Rose Lavelle – midfielder who represented the United States woman's national team and 2024 Olympic gold medalist
- Heather Mitts – defender who represented the United States woman's national team and three-time Olympic gold medalist
- Kyle Smith – defender
- M.A. Vignola – defender who represented the United States woman's national team

=== Swimming ===
- Deena Deardurff – 1972 Olympic swimming gold medalist
- Carson Foster – 2024 Olympic swimming silver medalist
- Joseph Hudepohl – Olympic swimmer
- Rebecca Jasontek – 2004 bronze medal-winning synchronized swimmer
- Jenny Kemp – 1972 Olympic swimming gold medalist
- Dan Ketchum – Olympic swimmer
- Walter Laufer – 1928 gold medal-winning swimmer
- Nick Thoman – 2012 swimming gold medalist

=== Tennis ===
- Ruth Sanders Cordes (1890–1968) – tennis player
- Louis Kuhler (1902–1925) – tennis player
- Caty McNally (2001–) – tennis player
- Monica Nolan (1913–1995) – tennis player
- Tony Trabert (1930–2021) – tennis player and instructor
- J.J. Wolf (1998–) – tennis player
- Clara Louise Zinke (1909–1978) – tennis player

=== Other ===
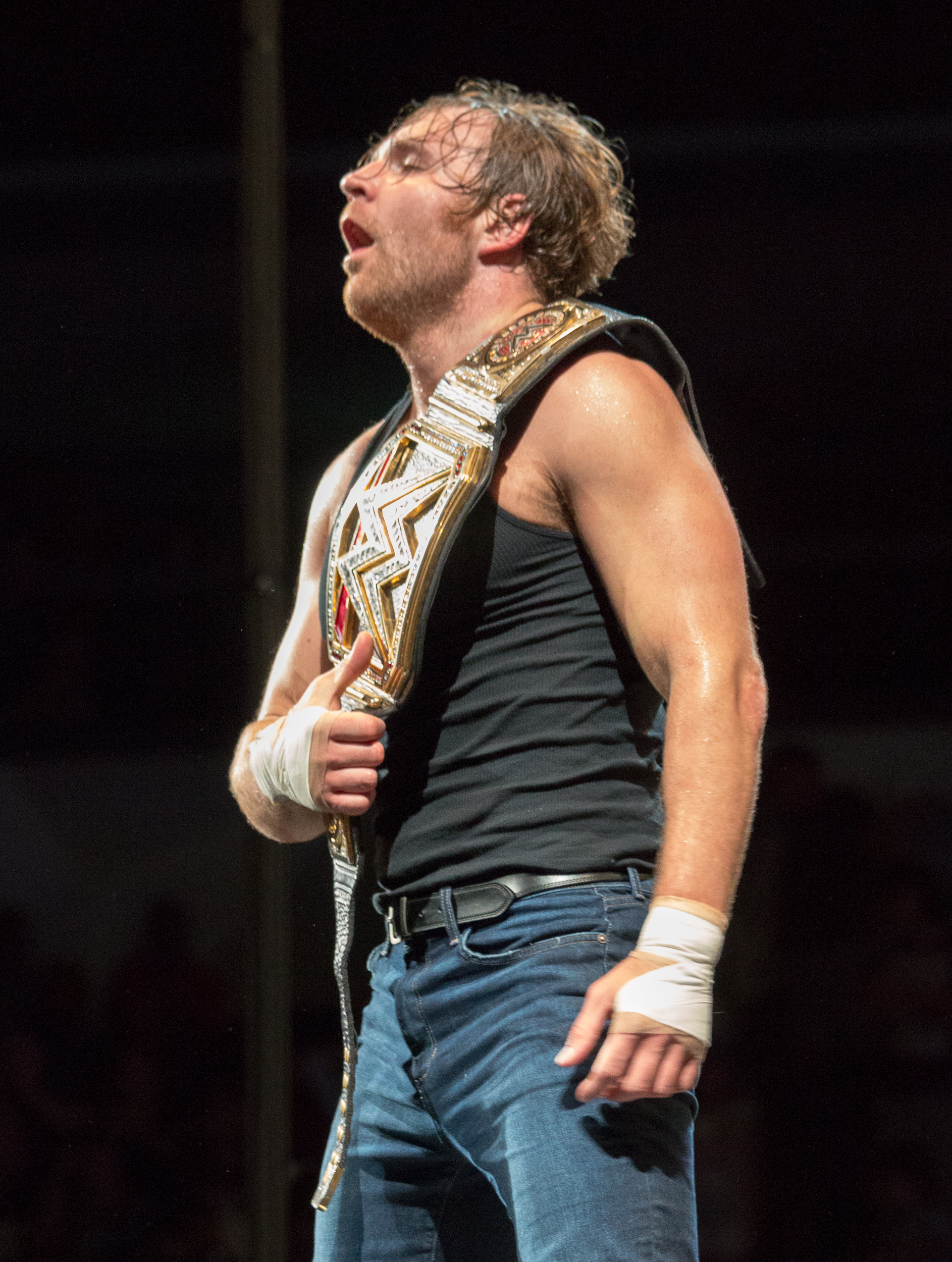
Jonathan "Jon Moxley" Good

- Rachael Adams – 2016 Olympic women's volleyball bronze medalist
- Eddie Arcaro – Triple Crown-winning jockey
- Amanda Borden – 1996 gold-medal winning gymnast
- Jordan Brauninger – figure skater
- Caleb Bragg – racecar driver and automobile inventor
- Amber Campbell – 2008 and 2012 Olympic Games hammer thrower
- Nina Castagna – rowing coxswain
- Steve Flesch (1967–) – professional golfer
- Rich Franklin – Ultimate Fighting Championship champion
- Christina Gao – figure skater
- Mike Goldberg – former Ultimate Fighting Championship play-by-play commentator
- Jim Herman (1977–) – professional golfer
- Harlan Holden – track and field athlete at the 1912 Summer Olympics
- Ted Horn – race car driver
- DeHart Hubbard – first African-American to win an individual Olympic gold medal
- Bob Lohr (1960–) – professional golfer
- Linda Miles – professional wrestler (WWE's "Shaniqua")
- Jon Moxley – AEW professional wrestler; formerly known as Dean Ambrose in WWE
- Darrell Pace – 1976 and 1984 Olympic gold-medal winning archer
- Brian Pillman – NFL nose tackle and professional wrestler
- Lexie Priessman – gymnast
- Vivian St. John – professional wrestler
- Brandon Sosna – sports administrator and executive
- Marissa Steen (1989–) – professional golfer
- Sam Stoller – sprinter and long jumper
- Matt Stryker – professional wrestler
- Les Thatcher – professional wrestler, announcer, and trainer
- Mary Lee Tracy – gymnastics coach
- Albertson Van Zo Post – 1904 double gold medal-winning fencer
- Mary Wineberg – 2008 Olympic gold medalist, track and field
- Russ Witherby – Olympic ice dancing competitor

== Military ==
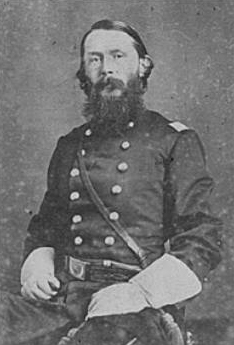
William Haines Lytle

- Nicholas Longworth Anderson – Civil War colonel
- George J. Austin (c. 1881–1930), Black military officer; worked for Black representation in the U.S. military during segregation
- Edward William Boers – Navy Medal of Honor recipient
- Henry Francis Bryan – United States Navy rear admiral and 17th governor of American Samoa
- James Calhoun – cavalryman killed at Battle of the Little Bighorn
- Henry M. Cist – Civil War general
- John Cook – Medal of Honor recipient at Battle of Antietam
- Wilson V. Eagleson II – U.S. Army Air Force officer and decorated combat fighter pilot with the Tuskegee Airmen
- James Augustin Greer – Civil War-era admiral
- Andrew Hickenlooper – Civil War general
- James Hirshfield – United States Coast Guard vice admiral, Navy Cross recipient
- Heinrich Hoffman – Civil War Medal of Honor recipient
- Francis Lupo – World War I soldier whose remains were discovered in 2003
- William Haines Lytle – poet; Civil War general; killed at Battle of Chickamauga (1863)
- Charles Wright Miner – US Army brigadier general
- James Pine – United States Coast Guard vice admiral
- George E. Stratemeyer – Air Force general
- Godfrey Weitzel – Union Civil War general

== Other notable people ==
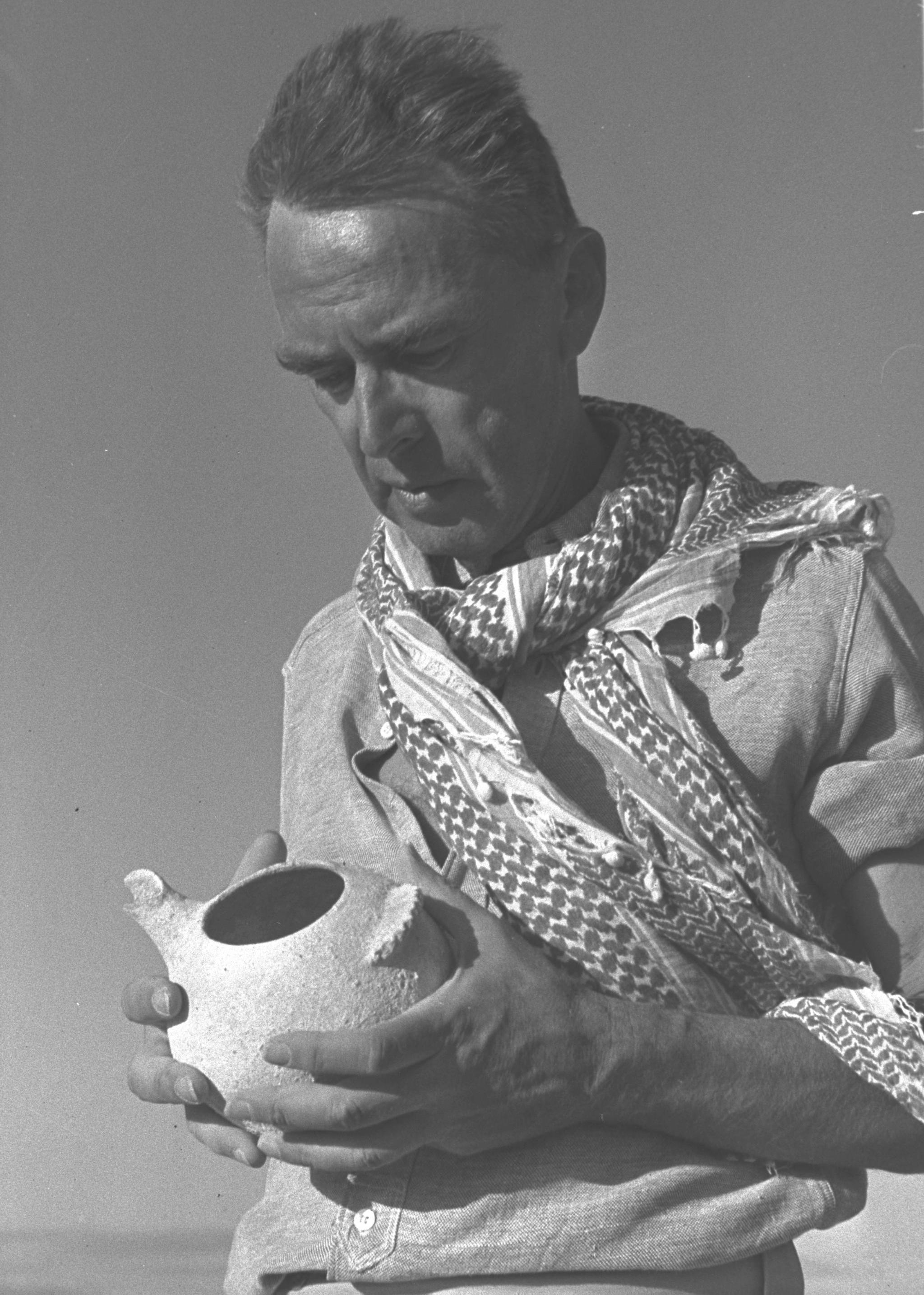
Nelson Glueck

- Clara Adams – aviation pioneer
- Pierre Adrian – chef at The Maisonette
- Joseph H. Albers – first bishop of Lansing, Michigan
- Anthony Allaire – New York City Police inspector
- Levi Addison Ault – businessman, naturalist, donor of Cincinnati's Ault Park
- John Bardo – 13th president of Wichita State University, 10th chancellor of Western Carolina University
- Samri Baldwin – stage magician
- Daniel Carter Beard – founder, Sons of Daniel Boone
- Kim Bobo – labor activist
- Kitty Burke – nightclub entertainer who attempted to bat in a baseball game
- Oba Chandler – rapist and murderer executed by lethal injection in Florida in 2011
- Peter H. Clark – abolitionist and educator
- Lorenzo Collins – mentally ill man shot by Cincinnati police in 1997
- Robert Daniel Conlon – Roman Catholic bishop of Steubenville, Ohio
- Sara Jane Crafts (1845–1930), educator, author, social reformer
- Jonathan Edwards – first president of Washington & Jefferson College
- Audrey Emery – heiress and socialite
- T. Higbee Embry – aviation enthusiast and co-founder of Embry-Riddle Aeronautical University
- Dana Fabe – chief justice, Alaska Supreme Court
- Bernard T. Espelage – first bishop of Gallup, New Mexico
- Mary Jane Farell – contract bridge player
- Susan Fessenden (1840–1932) – activist, social reformer
- Clifford Gayles – serial killer executed in Ohio's electric chair
- Nelson Glueck – rabbi and archaeologist
- Alfred Gottschalk – president of Hebrew Union College and leader in Reform Judaism
- Henry Joseph Grimmelsmann – first bishop of Evansville
- Alice Claypoole Gwynne – wife of Cornelius Vanderbilt II
- Don Helbig – Guinness World Record holder for roller coaster riding
- Edith Irwin Hobart – 14th president general of the Daughters of the American Revolution and 1st national president of the American Legion Auxiliary
- Helena Keith-Falconer, Countess of Kintore – heiress and socialite
- Alice Stone Ilchman – eighth president of Sarah Lawrence College
- Joseph Jonas – first Jew to settle in Cincinnati, founder of the Old Jewish Cemetery
- Posteal Laskey – serial killer nicknamed the "Cincinnati Strangler"
- Mike Mangold – pilot
- Charles Manson – cult leader, convicted murderer
- Davy Miller, Chicagoan gangster, born in Cincinnati.
- Carl K. Moeddel – auxiliary bishop of Roman Catholic Archdiocese of Cincinnati, 1993–2007
- Julian Morgenstern – rabbi, professor, and president of Hebrew Union College
- Anthony John King Mussio – first Roman Catholic bishop of Steubenville, Ohio
- David Leroy Nickens – freed slave, first African-American licensed minister in Ohio
- David Philipson – Reform rabbi
- Harriet Augusta Prunk – educator and school founder
- John Baptist Purcell – long-serving Roman Catholic bishop of Cincinnati
- George Remus – bootlegger
- Robert Ruwe – United States Tax Court judge
- William Knox Schroeder – student killed in the Kent State shootings
- Hermann, Freiherr von Soden – biblical scholar
- Joseph Strauss – chief engineer of the Golden Gate Bridge
- Annie Sinton-Taft – founder of the Taft Museum of Art
- Jule Sugarman – creator of Head Start
- Denise Trauth – 9th president of Texas State University
- Myra L. Uhlfelder – classicist
- Otto Warmbier – University of Virginia student arrested in North Korea; later died in custody in 2017
- Irvin F. Westheimer – founder of Big Brothers Big Sisters of America
