= Henry Stephenson (disambiguation) =

Henry Stephenson (1871–1956) was a British film and stage actor.

Henry Stephenson may also refer to:

- Henry Stephenson (Australian politician) (1862–1930)
- Henry Frederick Stephenson (MP), British politician
- Henry Stephenson (Royal Navy officer) (1842–1919), Royal Navy officer
- Henry Stephenson (rugby union), Royal Navy officer and international rugby union player
- Sir Henry Stephenson, 1st Baronet (1865–1947), British politician
- Henry Palfrey Stephenson (1826–1890), Scottish-born civil engineer
- Henry Spencer Stephenson (1871–1957), British minister
- Henry Thew Stephenson (1870–1957), teacher and writer
