= Murder of Thora Chamberlain =

Disappearance of American student

Thora Chamberlain
- Photograph of Chamberlain
- Born: Thora Afton Chamberlain; November 22, 1930; United States
- Died: c. November 2, 1945 (aged 14); Campbell, California, U.S.
- Education: Campbell High School (California)
- Occupation: Student
- Known for: Her disappearance and presumed murder

Thora Afton Chamberlain (November 22, 1930 – c. November 2, 1945) was a 14-year-old female American high school student who was reported missing on November 2, 1945. Although Thomas Henry McMonigle was convicted for Chamberlain's murder, her body was never found.

== Disappearance ==
Chamberlain was last seen outside Campbell High School in Campbell, California, after the end of her classes. According to her classmates, she spoke for several minutes with a motorist on Winchester Boulevard, who told her he was looking for someone to babysit his sister's children for the afternoon. The man wore a US Navy uniform and military medals. Chamberlain accepted the offer and got into the car with him.

== Investigation ==
Law enforcement's suspicions fell immediately upon Thomas Henry McMonigle, a San Mateo, California, resident with an arrest record going back to his teens and including antecedents for assault and attempted rape. McMonigle had left the area immediately and moved to his father's home in Illinois. On December 6, McMonigle attempted to commit suicide with an overdose of sleeping pills while riding a bus to San Francisco, but he was rushed to a hospital and made a full recovery. After his discharge, he was immediately arrested by FBI agents investigating Chamberlain's disappearance.

McMonigle, who had never served in the Navy, confessed to having found the uniform and medals in a footlocker that he had stolen from a real serviceman. This footlocker was found in McMonigle's home's garage in San Mateo. However, he offered wildly varying stories about Chamberlain's death and what had happened to her body. At various times, McMonigle claimed to have murdered Chamberlain by shooting, stabbing, or strangling her; to have shot her accidentally; to have seen her die after a fall from his car, and to not be involved in her death at all. An examination of McMonigle's car found a bullet hole in the inside of a door, lending credence to the idea that Chamberlain had been shot in the vehicle. McMonigle claimed to have removed the bullet from the door and buried it under a certain tree in his backyard; and also to have ripped out the car's padding and upholstery because they had been stained with Chamberlain's blood, and subsequently buried them in a drainage ditch near his workplace. Both places were searched, and the bullet and car parts (still covered in blood) were recovered successfully. The bullet was tested and proven to have been fired from McMonigle's .32 caliber Colt revolver.

McMonigle also claimed to have thrown Chamberlain's body off a cliff overlooking Half Moon Bay on the San Mateo County coast, known as the Devil's Slide. Police searched the area and found two pairs of red and blue socks wedged on the cliff's face, which were recognized by Chamberlain's parents. McMonigle's claim that he had buried Chamberlain's clothes in his backyard could not be confirmed, but a separate excavation by the FBI at the construction site where McMonigle had been working at the time of the disappearance turned up a pair of shoes, schoolbooks, papers, a zippered binder and a cowbell property of Chamberlain.

== Prosecution of McMonigle ==
The prosecution theorized that McMonigle abducted Chamberlain with the intention of raping her, murdered her when she tried to resist, and later carried her body to the Devil's Slide and tossed it into the ocean. He was pronounced guilty by the jury after only 38 minutes of deliberation, and sentenced to die in the gas chamber. While on death row, he confessed to the murder of a San Francisco woman by the name of Dorothy Rose Woods and later claimed to have murdered eleven people overall, but he was not charged with more murders. In his last statement before his execution in 1948, however, McMonigle claimed that he was not involved in Chamberlain's disappearance.

== See also ==
- List of kidnappings
- List of murder convictions without a body
- List of people executed in the United States in 1948
- List of solved missing person cases
