= David Joseph Watson =

American executed by the U.S. federal government

- Born: September 23, 1923; Portsmouth, Virginia, U.S.
- Died: September 15, 1948 (aged 24); Florida State Prison, Florida, U.S.
- Status: Executed by electrocution
- Motive: Sexual assault Witness elimination
- Conviction: First degree murder
- Penalty: Death

Details
- Victims: Benjamin Leroy Hobbs, 19
- Date: July 25, 1946
- Location: USS Stribling (DD-867)

David Joseph Watson (September 23, 1923 – September 15, 1948) was a member of the United States Navy who was executed by the U.S. government for a murder committed on the high seas (a federal offense). Watson was convicted of the murder of Benjamin Leroy Hobbs, a fellow seaman, aboard a U.S. naval ship that was docked in Florida. After two trials, Watson was executed in Florida's electric chair since, at the time, federal death row inmates were executed by the primary method of execution prescribed in the state where they committed their offense. Watson was the third inmate executed on a federal death warrant under President Harry S. Truman, as well as the second executed in Florida, after James Alderman in 1929. He was the first, and likely only, federal condemned man to be electrocuted in Florida. (Note: As of July 2026, the federal government mandates that all federal executions must take place by lethal injection in a death chamber located at the United States Penitentiary, Terre Haute in Indiana.)

== Background and murder ==
Newspaper accounts described David Watson as a Black American "navy cook" who was "short, stocky, and powerfully built," with an "above average" education. He was a native of Portsmouth and Norfolk, Virginia, who spent some time in the Virginia Manual Labor School, a reform school in Petersburg, Virginia, when he was a teenager. His victim, 19-year-old Benjamin Leroy Hobbs, was from Nebo, North Carolina, and lived with his impoverished and widowed mother. At the time he was murdered, Hobbs was five days away from being honorably discharged, after which he planned to move in with his mother to help her with the family farm.

In the early morning hours of July 25, 1946, near Key West in Florida, Watson murdered Hobbs. The two were aboard the USS Stribling, a naval ship, at the time of the murder; Hobbs' body was found in one of the ship's gun turrets the next day. Two days after the murder, authorities placed Watson in naval custody as he was the prime suspect in the murder. For two weeks, authorities carried out a "highly secret" manhunt to confirm the identity of the killer, monitoring Watson's shipmates as well to detect their movements and eliminate other suspects. After two weeks of searching and twelve days of keeping Watson in custody, the FBI and the office of naval intelligence extracted an oral confession from Watson. Watson confessed to committing the murder alone. His primary motive was sexual assault; he had attempted to sexually attack Hobbs in his bunk, but when Hobbs fought back, Watson decided to kill him to avoid detection and consequences for the sexual attack. After the attempted sexual assault, Watson bludgeoned and strangled Hobbs to death. Watson also robbed Hobbs of $1.78.

When Watson was first arrested, he was held in a naval shipyard in Miami. Later, after authorities transported Watson to the county jail in Miami to await his trial for murder, they discovered an iron bar and two hidden razors on his person.

== Trials ==
Watson had two trials. During the first, which took place in October 1946, Watson's mother Inez, a schoolteacher born in Pennsylvania, was reported to have attended many of the proceedings. On October 4, 1946, Watson was convicted of first-degree murder, and the jury refused to recommend mercy, resulting in Watson receiving a death sentence. However, this first sentence was reversed on appeal sometime in 1947, and Watson earned a second trial.

During Watson's second trial, his defense attempted to paint Watson as someone afflicted with a "psychopathic personality." Attorney A.C. Dressler stated during the defense's closing statements, "[Watson] has a warped mind; he is a lost soul. If you comply with the oath you took, you cannot kill. You cannot send this boy to the chair." Watson's other defense attorney, John G. Sawyer, argued that Watson should be put away in prison for life "for the good of society. His life should not be taken."

However, the United States District Attorney working for the prosecution, Herbert S. Phillips, argued that Watson was a "cunning murderer." The prosecution, basing their arguments on Watson's confession, purported that Watson's motive for murdering Hobbs was to avoid detection and a court martial after Watson had attempted to commit a "pervert act" on Hobbs. Contrasting the defense's argument that Watson's psychopathy made him less responsible for his actions, Phillips read Watson's confession to the jury and stated that the confession showed that Watson was fully aware of his actions.

The judge, John W. Holland, instructed the jury that if they agreed with the defense that Watson was not criminally responsible for his actions because of his purported psychopathy impairing his judgment, then the jury could not find him guilty of a crime higher than second-degree murder. As first degree murder was the only murder charge punishable by death by the federal government at the time, the jury finding Watson guilty of second degree murder or less would have saved his life. However, the second trial concluded on August 7, 1947, and Watson was again convicted of first-degree murder; the jury again refused to recommend mercy, and Watson was again sentenced to death. Judge Holland formally passed the second sentence two weeks after the jury reached their verdict.

== Appeals and execution ==
Watson appealed his second death sentence to the District Court of the United States for the Southern District of Florida. The first death sentence had been reversed due to an error involving the judge not instructing the jury on the possibility of Watson being found guilty of a lesser charge due to mental impairment. However, on April 1, 1948, the second death sentence was affirmed, with the District Court finding that Watson's murder was "shocking" and committed with "vile motive," and that "the trial court went to great lengths to see to it that the defendant had a fair and lawful trial." The second judgment affirming his death sentence also pointed out that two separate juries had found Watson guilty of the same crime on the same "overwhelming evidence" and that the second trial was "free from reversible error," thereby paving the way for Watson to be executed.

In one final attempt to save his life, Watson appealed to President Harry S. Truman for clemency, but Truman refused to intervene in the sentence, making his intentions known a week prior to the scheduled execution date.

According to the Associated Press, Watson spent his final hours praying with a minister and singing hymns. He also received a final visit from his mother. On the morning of Wednesday, September 15, 1948, Watson was executed in the electric chair at the Florida State Prison in Raiford, Florida, where Florida kept their electric chair. He was placed in the chair at 9:11 A.M. and pronounced dead a few minutes later.

Watson was the third federal inmate executed under President Truman and one of only two inmates executed on a federal execution warrant in Florida during the 20th century. Unlike the first, James Alderman, Watson was put to death in Florida's electric chair in the Union Correctional Institution while Alderman was hanged at the U.S. Coast Guard Station near Fort Lauderdale, Florida. At the time of Alderman's execution, it was customary for all federal inmates to be executed by hanging regardless of the method used by the state where they committed their capital crime. However, the law changed in 1936 following the botched hanging of Earl Gardner, a federal inmate in Arizona, where state law provided for executions by gas chamber. From 1936 onward, federal inmates were executed by the method used by the state where they committed their capital crime. During both Alderman's execution in 1929 and Watson's execution in 1948, the electric chair was Florida's method of execution, as the state had adopted the electric chair in 1923 and, save for Alderman's federal execution, exclusively used the electric chair instead of hanging starting in October 1924.

== See also ==
- Capital punishment by the United States federal government
- List of people executed by electrocution
- List of people executed by the United States federal government
- List of people executed in the United States in 1948
