= Robert Cobb (defensive end) =

American football player (1957–1995)

- Quilt in memory of Cobb

No. 97, 67, 63, 72, 74
- Position: Defensive end

Personal information
- Born: October 12, 1957; Cincinnati, Ohio, U.S.
- Died: April 9, 1995 (aged 37); Wyoming, U.S.
- Listed height: 6 ft 4 in (1.93 m)
- Listed weight: 248 lb (112 kg)

Career information
- High school: Aiken (Cincinnati)
- College: Arizona; Cincinnati
- NFL draft: 1981: 3rd round, 66th overall pick

Career history
- Los Angeles Rams (1981); Tampa Bay Buccaneers (1982); Chicago Blitz (1983); Washington Federals (1983–1984); Minnesota Vikings (1984)

Career NFL statistics
- Games played: 11
- Games started: 1
- Sacks: 1
- Stats at Pro Football Reference

Robert Lewis Cobb (October 12, 1957 – April 9, 1995) was an American professional football player who was a defensive end in the National Football League (NFL) and United States Football League (USFL). He played college football for the Cincinnati Bearcats and Arizona Wildcats before being selected by the Los Angeles Rams in the third round (66th overall pick) of the 1981 NFL draft. Scouting reports praised his size (6–4, 248 pounds) and speed (4.8 in 40-yard dash). He played in the NFL for the Rams (1981), Tampa Bay Buccaneers (1982), and Minnesota Vikings (1984).

Cobb died in Wyoming on April 9, 1995, of complications from AIDS. He was 37.

== See also ==
- List of people from Cincinnati
