= List of people executed in the United States in 1948 =

One hundred and seventeen people, all male, were executed in the United States in 1948, eighty-nine by electrocution, twenty by gas chamber, and eight by hanging.

Irvin Mattio became the last person to be executed in the United States for a crime committed at the age of 16. Going forward, nobody else would be executed in the United States for a crime committed while under the age of sixteen. Mattio was also the last juvenile offender to be executed in Louisiana until Dalton Prejean in 1990.

== List of people executed in the United States in 1948 ==
No.	Date of execution	Name	Age of person			Gender	Ethnicity	State	Method	Ref.
No.	Date of execution	Name	At execution	At offense	Age difference	Gender	Ethnicity	State	Method	Ref.
1	January 2, 1948	Joe Porter	27	27	0	Male	Black	Georgia	Electrocution	
2	January 2, 1948	Leroy Scrutchens	37	37	0	Male	Black	Georgia	Electrocution	
3	January 2, 1948	Frank Black	20	Unknown	Unknown	Male	Black	North Carolina	Gas chamber	
4	January 2, 1948	Earnest Howard	25	25	0	Male	Black	South Carolina	Electrocution	
5	January 2, 1948	Lonnie Harvey Cline	28	26	2	Male	White	Texas	Electrocution	
6	January 2, 1948	Paul William Burton	33	33	0	Male	White	West Virginia	Hanging	
7	January 5, 1948	Reuben Harper	30	29	1	Male	Black	Florida	Electrocution	
8	January 8, 1948	Jauvhan Jackson	19	18	1	Male	Black	New York	Electrocution	
9	January 9, 1948	Irvin Mattio	18	15	3	Male	Black	Louisiana	Electrocution	
10	January 9, 1948	Willie Edward Gidron	19	18	1	Male	Black	South Carolina	Electrocution	
11	January 16, 1948	John Henry Breeze	Unknown	Unknown	2	Male	Black	North Carolina	Gas chamber	
12	January 23, 1948	Jesse Lee Dickerson	22	Unknown	Unknown	Male	Black	Mississippi	Electrocution	
13	January 23, 1948	Wardell Heath Henderson	27	25	2	Male	Black	Oregon	Gas chamber	
14	January 23, 1948	Sam Baldwin	35	35	0	Male	Black	Virginia	Electrocution	
15	January 26, 1948	Jose Sanchez Sanchez	28	26	2	Male	Hispanic	California	Gas chamber	
16	January 30, 1948	George McKinley Sexton	21	20	1	Male	Black	Ohio	Electrocution	
17	January 30, 1948	Mark R. McCauley	36	35	1	Male	White	West Virginia	Hanging	
18	February 4, 1948	Nolan Edwin West	25	Unknown	Unknown	Male	White	Texas	Electrocution	
19	February 13, 1948	James Harold Hyde	27	26	1	Male	White	Arkansas	Electrocution	
20	February 13, 1948	Eddie Brown Jr.	23	23	0	Male	Black	Georgia	Electrocution	
21	February 16, 1948	J. W. Torbert	37	36	1	Male	Black	Georgia	Electrocution	
22	February 20, 1948	Thomas Henry McMonigle	33	31	2	Male	White	California	Gas chamber	
23	February 27, 1948	Luther Williams	27	27	0	Male	Black	Kentucky	Electrocution	
24	March 1, 1948	Austin Archibald Nelson	29	28	1	Male	Black	Federal government	Hanging	
25	March 5, 1948	James Mangum	18	16	2	Male	Black	Georgia	Electrocution	
26	March 12, 1948	Floyd Dace	22	21	1	Male	Black	Ohio	Electrocution	
27	March 19, 1948	Noel Jackson Grant Sr.	40	39	1	Male	White	Alabama	Electrocution	
28	March 19, 1948	John Henry Munson Jr.	28	26	2	Male	Black	Alabama	Electrocution	
29	March 26, 1948	L. P. Campbell	25	24	1	Male	Black	Georgia	Electrocution	
30	March 26, 1948	William Stewart	40	39	1	Male	Black	Mississippi	Electrocution	
31	March 28, 1948	Bennie Louis Johnson	25	23	2	Male	Black	Texas	Electrocution	
32	March 28, 1948	Clayton Homer Rushing	26	25	1	Male	White	Texas	Electrocution	
33	April 9, 1948	John J. Peterson	41	37	4	Male	White	California	Gas chamber	
34	April 12, 1948	Robert Bradley	37	35	2	Male	Black	Connecticut	Electrocution	
35	April 16, 1948	George Isby	26	24	2	Male	Black	California	Gas chamber	
36	April 22, 1948	Buster Hooks	28	27	1	Male	Black	North Carolina	Gas chamber	
37	April 22, 1948	John T. Kelley	21	20	1	Male	White	Tennessee	Electrocution	
38	April 22, 1948	James Daniel Sandusky Jr.	20	19	1	Male	White	Tennessee	Electrocution	
39	April 23, 1948	Joseph Bessar Jr.	22	19	3	Male	Black	Louisiana	Electrocution	
40	April 23, 1948	Wilbert Powell	21	18	3	Male	Black	Louisiana	Electrocution	
41	April 23, 1948	Booker Anderson	29	28	1	Male	Black	North Carolina	Gas chamber	
42	April 23, 1948	James J. Brooks	24	22	2	Male	Black	New Jersey	Electrocution	
43	April 23, 1948	Kenneth Robert Salter	34	32	2	Male	White	Ohio	Electrocution	
44	April 23, 1948	John Major Brooks	27	26	1	Male	Black	Virginia	Electrocution	
45	April 25, 1948	Willie Sims	36	33	3	Male	Black	Texas	Electrocution	
46	April 30, 1948	Herbert Hopkins	Unknown	Unknown	0	Male	Black	Louisiana	Electrocution	
47	April 30, 1948	Henry Tilghman Jackson	32	28	4	Male	Black	Maryland	Hanging	
48	April 30, 1948	Roy Lee Lathco	39	Unknown	Unknown	Male	White	Maryland	Hanging	
49	April 30, 1948	Ollie Smith Jr.	22	21	1	Male	Black	Maryland	Hanging	
50	May 7, 1948	James Leroy Jackson	42	42	0	Male	Black	North Carolina	Gas chamber	
51	May 25, 1948	Lewis Grayson	31	28	3	Male	Black	Oklahoma	Electrocution	
52	May 28, 1948	Paul Charles Winton	51	51	0	Male	Native American	California	Gas chamber	
53	June 4, 1948	George Hammond	30	29	1	Male	Black	North Carolina	Gas chamber	
54	June 4, 1948	Henderson Wilson	27	26	1	Male	Black	North Carolina	Gas chamber	
55	June 14, 1948	Alexander Harley Wiles	41	39	2	Male	White	Florida	Electrocution	
56	June 18, 1948	Wallis Hamburg	22	21	1	Male	White	Mississippi	Electrocution	
57	June 25, 1948	Edward Spriggs Jr.	21	Unknown	Unknown	Male	Black	Louisiana	Electrocution	
58	June 25, 1948	Monroe Gipson	19	18	1	Male	Black	Mississippi	Electrocution	
59	June 29, 1948	Marvin Murray	24	22	2	Male	Black	Mississippi	Electrocution	
60	July 1, 1948	Anthony R. Papa	27	26	1	Male	White	New York	Electrocution	
61	July 2, 1948	Edward Pugh	20	19	1	Male	Black	Arkansas	Electrocution	
62	July 2, 1948	Rufus Willis	20	Unknown	Unknown	Male	Black	Mississippi	Electrocution	
63	July 2, 1948	Clifford William Gayles	34	34	0	Male	Black	Ohio	Electrocution	
64	July 9, 1948	Joseph Lee Saulter	33	32	1	Male	White	Texas	Electrocution	
65	July 12, 1948	Grant Holley	48	46	2	Male	Black	Pennsylvania	Electrocution	
66	July 16, 1948	Elmer Curnutt	21	21	0	Male	White	Ohio	Electrocution	
67	July 18, 1948	John Amos Coleman	57	Unknown	Unknown	Male	Black	Texas	Electrocution	
68	July 22, 1948	Lester Haughton	24	22	2	Male	Black	New York	Electrocution	
69	July 22, 1948	George Cornelius Moore	34	32	2	Male	Black	New York	Electrocution	
70	July 30, 1948	Jasper Nease	24	23	1	Male	White	Kentucky	Electrocution	
71	August 1, 1948	Henry Brown	23	Unknown	Unknown	Male	Black	Texas	Electrocution	
72	August 13, 1948	Red Lamar Nunn	43	42	1	Male	Black	Georgia	Electrocution	
73	August 16, 1948	Sam Whitt Jr.	22	Unknown	Unknown	Male	Black	Georgia	Electrocution	
74	August 20, 1948	Donald E. Frohner	18	16	2	Male	White	Ohio	Electrocution	
75	August 20, 1948	Riley Brown McCaine	43	40	3	Male	White	Texas	Electrocution	
76	August 23, 1948	Alonzo Washington Jr.	26	26	0	Male	Black	Florida	Electrocution	
77	August 24, 1948	Cleo Smith	29	Unknown	Unknown	Male	Black	Texas	Electrocution	
78	August 31, 1948	Thomas Howard Taylor	33	32	1	Male	Black	Tennessee	Electrocution	
79	August 31, 1948	James Monroe Scribner	23	22	1	Male	Black	Tennessee	Electrocution	
80	August 31, 1948	William J. C. Turner	21	20	1	Male	Black	Tennessee	Electrocution	
81	September 6, 1948	Elbert Eugene Harper	30	29	1	Male	Black	Florida	Electrocution	
82	September 6, 1948	Alfonso Enmond	35	35	0	Male	Black	Florida	Electrocution	
83	September 15, 1948	David Joseph Watson	24	22	2	Male	Black	Federal government	Electrocution	
84	September 16, 1948	John Henry Reilly	33	31	2	Male	White	New York	Electrocution	
85	September 16, 1948	Milton Shaket	34	32	2	Male	White	New York	Electrocution	
86	September 17, 1948	Lawrence Davis	29	28	1	Male	Black	South Carolina	Electrocution	
87	September 23, 1948	Matthew Perison	31	31	0	Male	Black	West Virginia	Hanging	
88	September 27, 1948	Ben Gould	40	40	0	Male	Black	Oklahoma	Electrocution	
89	September 28, 1948	George Cole	25	23	2	Male	Black	New Jersey	Electrocution	
90	September 28, 1948	George Hicks	23	21	2	Male	Black	New Jersey	Electrocution	
91	October 1, 1948	Joseph A. Trujillo	30	28	2	Male	Hispanic	California	Gas chamber	
92	October 3, 1948	Andrew Hill	23	Unknown	Unknown	Male	Black	Texas	Electrocution	
93	October 5, 1948	Lonnie Lee Talley	25	24	1	Male	Black	Florida	Electrocution	
94	October 11, 1948	William Rumage	30	22	8	Male	White	Pennsylvania	Electrocution	
95	October 15, 1948	Arthur Robert Eggers	54	51	3	Male	White	California	Gas chamber	
96	October 15, 1948	J. B. Beetles	32	31	1	Male	Black	Georgia	Electrocution	
97	October 15, 1948	William Cular Davis	55	54	1	Male	Black	Georgia	Electrocution	
98	October 15, 1948	Lemuel Thomas Steed	28	28	0	Male	Black	West Virginia	Hanging	
99	October 25, 1948	Lacy Stewart	19	17	2	Male	Black	Florida	Electrocution	
100	October 25, 1948	Nathaniel Henry Strain	26	17	9	Male	Black	Ohio	Electrocution	
101	October 29, 1948	Johnnie James	30	Unknown	Unknown	Male	Black	Virginia	Electrocution	
102	November 5, 1948	Jewell Jay Eller	21	19	2	Male	White	Georgia	Electrocution	
103	November 5, 1948	Charlie Corn Garrett	26	25	1	Male	White	Georgia	Electrocution	
104	November 5, 1948	Daniel Troy McPeak	22	21	1	Male	White	Kentucky	Electrocution	
105	November 8, 1948	Daniel Peter Taranow	24	23	1	Male	White	Pennsylvania	Electrocution	
106	November 19, 1948	James Pete West	21	20	1	Male	Black	North Carolina	Gas chamber	
107	November 26, 1948	L. C. Brown	25	25	0	Male	Black	Georgia	Electrocution	
108	December 1, 1948	Timothy Iron Bear	24	22	2	Male	Native American	Nebraska	Electrocution	
109	December 3, 1948	Samuel Richard Shockley	39	37	2	Male	White	Federal government	Gas chamber	
110	December 3, 1948	Miran Edgar Thompson	30	28	2	Male	White	Federal government	Gas chamber	
111	December 3, 1948	Matthew Jaminson Jr.	17	17	0	Male	Black	South Carolina	Electrocution	
112	December 10, 1948	Carlos Romero Ochoa	29	27	2	Male	Hispanic	Federal government	Gas chamber	
113	December 10, 1948	Jesse James Patton	23	21	2	Male	Black	District of Columbia	Electrocution	
114	December 10, 1948	Reginald Joseph Wheeler	28	26	2	Male	Black	District of Columbia	Electrocution	
115	December 10, 1948	Eugene Raist Cooper	21	20	1	Male	Black	Mississippi	Electrocution	
116	December 31, 1948	Robert F. Mehaffey	38	37	1	Male	White	California	Gas chamber	
117	December 31, 1948	Leroy Grant Troy	22	22	0	Male	Black	South Carolina	Electrocution	

== Demographics ==
Gender
Male	117	100%
Female	0	0%
Ethnicity
Black	80	68%
White	32	27%
Hispanic	3	3%
Native American	2	2%
State
Georgia	13	11%
Texas	11	9%
California	8	7%
North Carolina	8	7%
Florida	7	6%
Mississippi	7	6%
Ohio	7	6%
New York	6	5%
Federal government	5	4%
Louisiana	5	4%
South Carolina	5	4%
Tennessee	5	4%
West Virginia	4	3%
Kentucky	3	3%
Maryland	3	3%
New Jersey	3	3%
Pennsylvania	3	3%
Virginia	3	3%
Alabama	2	2%
Arkansas	2	2%
District of Columbia	2	2%
Oklahoma	2	2%
Connecticut	1	1%
Nebraska	1	1%
Oregon	1	1%
Method
Electrocution	89	76%
Gas chamber	20	17%
Hanging	8	7%
Month
January	17	15%
February	6	5%
March	9	8%
April	17	15%
May	3	3%
June	7	6%
July	11	9%
August	10	9%
September	10	9%
October	11	9%
November	6	5%
December	10	9%
Age
Unknown	2	2%
10–19	8	7%
20–29	64	55%
30–39	30	26%
40–49	9	8%
50–59	4	3%
Total	117	100%

== Executions in recent years ==
Number of executions
1949	120
1948	117
1947	158
Total	395

Preceded by 1947	List of people executed in the United States in 1948	Succeeded by 1949
