= Kabaka Oba =

American civil rights activist and public transportation worker

Michael Bailey, better known as Kabaka Oba (/ˈɒbɑː/; February 9, 1958 – April 15, 2006), was an American civil rights activist and public transportation worker who was fatally shot outside City Hall in Cincinnati, Ohio.

== Founding the Black Fist ==
Kabaka Oba co-founded the "Black Fist" for the purposes of opposing police brutality. The group had been previously known as "The Black Special Forces."

== Activism ==
Kabaka Oba had a radio show on Cincinnati local public radio station WAIF (88.3 FM) from noon - 1 p.m. on Tuesdays.

Oba, a bus driver for Southwest Ohio Regional Transit Authority, frequently addressed Cincinnati City Council with language and conduct that once caused him to be banned from addressing City Council for 60 days.

== Shooting and death ==
Kabaka Oba was shot at approximately 2:55 p.m. April 12, 2006, across from Cincinnati City Hall near 810 Plum Street after addressing Cincinnati City Council. He was shot while sitting in his late model green Ford Mustang with Ohio vanity plates "KABAKA".

He was taken to the University of Cincinnati Medical Center where he received surgery and had been listed in critical condition as of the evening of April 12, 2006. He died three days later at the same hospital on April 15, 2006.

Visitation was scheduled for 4–6 p.m. Sunday, April 23, 2006, at the Corinthian Baptist Church, at 772 Whittier Street in the Avondale neighborhood of Cincinnati.

Oba was interred on Monday, April 24, 2006, in a plot at the Crown Hill Memorial Park in Colerain Township next to Roger Owensby, Jr., a black man who died while in Cincinnati police custody in 2000, in accordance with the wishes of Owensby's father.

== Shooting suspect ==
Howard Beatty, a resident of the West End neighborhood of Cincinnati, turned himself in to Cincinnati Police Chief Thomas H. Streicher, Jr., on the evening of April 12, 2006, for the shooting of Kabaka Oba / Michael Bailey. Reportedly, Oba identified Beatty as his attacker to emergency workers.

Howard Beatty was initially charged with felonious assault, a charge that was upgraded to aggravated murder on April 20, 2006, due to Kabaka Oba succumbing to his injuries on April 15, 2006. The case was scheduled to be presented to a grand jury on April 28, 2006.

Municipal Court Judge Elizabeth B. Mattingly set bond for Beatty at one million dollars and ordered Beatty be held on another $50,000 bond for violating the protection order against him, which ordered Beatty to stay 500 feet from Oba. Beatty was convicted on a lesser count of voluntary manslaughter and sentenced to 13 years in prison. He was released from prison in March 2019.
