= Clifford Gayles =

Executed American serial killer

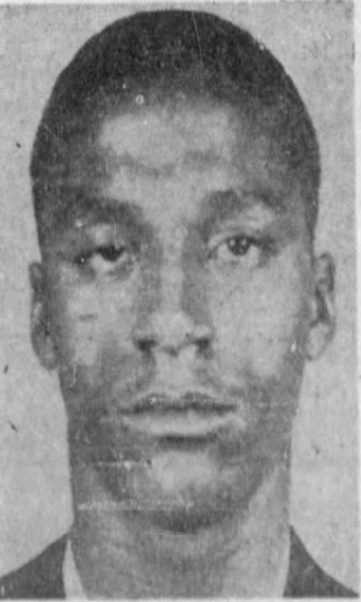
- Born: Clifford William Gayles; 1913; Cincinnati, Ohio, U.S.
- Died: July 2, 1948 (aged 35); Ohio State Penitentiary, Ohio, U.S.
- Status: Executed by electrocution
- Convictions: First degree murder Second degree murder
- Penalty: Life imprisonment (1934); Death (1947)

Details
- Victims: 3
- Span of crimes: 1934–1947
- Country: United States
- State: Ohio
- Date apprehended: For the final time on October 1, 1947

Clifford William Gayles (1913 – July 2, 1948) was an American serial killer who committed two murders during a Labor Day murder spree in southwestern Ohio in 1947, three years after being released from prison for a previous murder conviction. For the latter crimes, Gayles was sentenced to death and subsequently executed in 1948.

== First murder ==
On October 5, 1934, Gayles got into an altercation with 25-year-old Mamie Robinson Barnes, his girlfriend, behind a YMCA in Cincinnati. In the resulting scuffle, he pulled out a knife and stabbed her nine times in the heart. After the murder, Gayles dropped the knife in the alley and went to the local police station, where he readily confessed to the crime. He was placed in a jail cell while two officers were dispatched to verify his claims, with them locating Barnes' body in the alley not long after. By the time they returned, Gayles had fallen asleep, and when he was questioned by detectives, he explained that he had stabbed her with the knife without providing a reason why. As a result, he was charged with first degree murder, found guilty of second degree murder, and sentenced to life in prison.

== Release and murder spree ==
Gayles served ten years, the minimum required before he was eligible for parole, and was released on January 22, 1945, after a recommendation from the Parole Board. Sometime during the following two years, he developed a relationship with an underage girl named Ada Davidson, who lived together with her older sister Ollie in Xenia. On August 31, 1947, he went to their home and asked to take Ada on a trip for the Labor Day weekend, to which Ollie vehemently objected, as she disapproved of their relationship. Angered by her response, Gayles brandished a gun and shot her in the thigh, before taking Ada and fleeing in his car. Ollie Davidson was transported to a hospital in Springfield, where she succumbed to her injuries a week later.

That same night, the pair drove to Franklin, where they came across 33-year-old Edna Adkins and her 10-year-old son, Paul, who were waiting in their car to pick up an acquaintance. Gayles stopped and held them at gunpoint, before commandeering their vehicle and ordering them to accompany him. Along the way, he ordered Edna to take off her clothes while he pistol-whipped Paul for being too noisy. After driving for some time, he stopped at a desolate road and dragged Edna off to the bushes, where he raped and shot her. After doing this, he returned to the car, pistol-whipped Paul again, threw him out the car and drove away. Both mother and son were found by passers-by and driven to a hospital in Middletown, where Edna succumbed to her injuries.

Using the Adkins' car, Gayles and Davidson drove towards Cincinnati, but on the way got into an accident with another motorist near Glendale. Gayles then got into an argument with the driver, 45-year-old Edgar Rizzo of Cold Spring, Kentucky, whom he proceeded to stab multiple times and dragged into his car afterwards. He then drove towards Wyoming, where he dumped the injured man near a turnpike. Unlike the previous victims and in spite of his severe injuries, Rizzo managed to survive the ordeal.

== Arrest, trial and execution ==
The day after the crimes were committed, police departments across several counties organized to hunt the fugitive down. Eventually, the FBI was brought in to assist state authorities, managing to track the pair down to New Orleans, Louisiana, where they were arrested on October 1, 1947. Neither Gayles nor Davidson resisted arrest, and were subsequently extradited to Ohio to face charges there. His case sparked a debate in parole procedures and how the state's parole board assessed which criminals should be considered violent or not.

Gayles was tried for first degree murder in the death of Edna Adkins. Before his trial started, Gayles was ordered to undergo a psychiatric evaluation which determined that he was fully sane when the crimes were committed. Nevertheless, Gayles still pleaded insanity, with his aunt testifying at trial that he had been acting strangely since he was hit with an axe on the head at age 16. The testimony did not convince the jurors, who unanimously found him guilty and recommended no mercy, resulting in a death sentence. Gayles showed no emotion during the sentencing phase. In contrast to this, Ada Davidson pleaded guilty to charges of second-degree murder and was sentenced to life imprisonment. She was released on parole on February 20, 1958.

A few months prior to his execution date, Gayles' wife officially filed for divorce and was granted custody of their 14-year-old son. On July 2, 1948, Gayles was executed in the Ohio Penitentiary's electric chair. He accepted his death calmly, and per his final request, his eyes were surgically removed post-mortem and donated to an eye bank in New York.

== See also ==
- Capital punishment in Ohio
- List of people executed in the United States in 1948
- List of serial killers in the United States
