= List of Louisville Cardinals men's basketball head coaches =

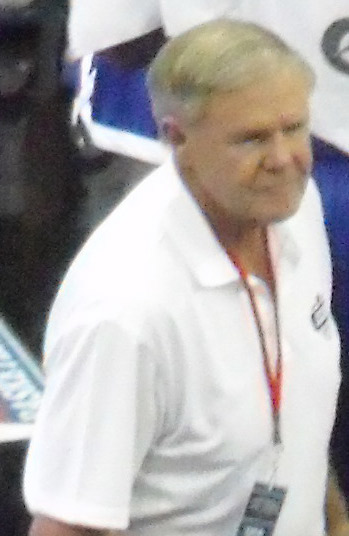
Denny Crum, the winningest head coach in Cardinals men's basketball history.

The following is a list of Louisville Cardinals men's basketball head coaches. There have been 23 head coaches of the Cardinals in their 110-season history.

Louisville's current head coach is Pat Kelsey. He was hired as the Cardinals' head coach in March 2024, replacing Kenny Payne, who was fired two weeks prior.

No.	Tenure	Coach	Years	Record	Pct.
1	1911–1912	William Gardiner	1	0–3	.000
–	1912–1915	No coach	3	8–14	.364
2	1915–1918 (Note: Louisville did not field a team for the 1916–17 season.) (Note: Bowman coached the first game of the 1918–19 season, a loss, before turning head coaching duties over to Earl Ford.)	Ed Bowman	3	11–7	.611
3	1918–1919	Earl Ford	1	7–4	.636
4	1919–1920	Tuley Brucker	1	6–5	.545
5	1920–1921	Jimmie Powers	1	3–8	.273
6	1921–1922	John O'Rourke	1	1–13	.071
7	1923–1925	Fred Enke	2	14–20	.412
8	1925–1930	Tom King	5	44–31	.587
9	1930–1932	Edward Weber	2	20–18	.526
10	1932–1936	C. V. Money	4	46–40	.535
11	1936–1940	Laurie Apitz	4	10–52	.161
12	1940–1942	John Heldman Jr.	2	9–24	.273
13	1943–1944	Harold Church and Walter Casey	1	10–10	.500
14	1944–1967	Bernard Hickman	23	443–183	.708
15	1967–1971 (Note: Dromo suffered a heart attack after a game on January 2, 1971. Howard Stacey was named interim head coach for the remainder of the 1970–71 season.)	John Dromo	4	68–23	.747
16	1971*	Howard Stacey	1	12–8	.600
17	1971–2001	Denny Crum	30	675–295	.696
18	2001–2017 (Note: Louisville vacated 126 games from 2011 through 2015. Pitino's on-court record is 416–143 (.744).) (Note: Pitino was placed on administrative leave in September 2017. David Padgett served as interim head coach for the 2017–18 season.)	Rick Pitino	16	293–140	.677
19	2017–2018*	David Padgett	1	22–14	.611
20	2018–2022 (Note: Mack was suspended for the first six games of the 2021–22 season. Mike Pegues served as interim head coach for these six games.) (Note: Mack was fired in January 2022. Mike Pegues served as interim head coach for the remainder of the 2021–22 season.)	Chris Mack	4	63–36	.636
21	2021* (Note: Pegues served as interim head coach for two separate, non-consecutive periods during the 2021–22 season.); 2022*	Mike Pegues	1	7–11	.389
22	2022–2024	Kenny Payne	2	12–52	.188
23	2024–present	Pat Kelsey	2	51–19	.729
Totals		23 coaches	110 seasons	1,801–1,018	.639
Records updated through end of 2024–25 season * - Denotes interim head coach. Source
