= Henry Thew Stephenson =

- Born: April 22, 1870; Cincinnati
- Died: 1957 (aged 86–87)
- Education: Ohio State University, Harvard University & Indiana University
- Known for: Writing
- Title: Prof.
- Parent(s): Reuben Henry and Louise (Wright) Stephenson

Henry Thew Stephenson (April 22, 1870 – 1957) was a teacher and writer.

Stephenson was born in Cincinnati to Reuben Henry and Louise (Wright) Stephenson. He attended Woodward High School before gaining degrees from Ohio State University, Harvard University. and Indiana University. He spent a year doing research at the British Museum.

Stephenson joined the faculty of the English Department at Indiana University in 1895. In 1898, he took some time off to get a second bachelor's degree from Harvard University. Stephenson remained with the English department at IU until his retirement in 1940. From 1919-1921, he served as Chairman of the Department. Stephenson was a charter member of the Phi Beta Kappa Chapter at IU which began in 1910. Also in 1910, he was awarded an A.M. Privitam degree, which was created in order to confer alumni status on non-alumni faculty members who had a long service record or held a high rank. Stephenson was well-known as a teacher of Shakespeare. Stephenson published a number of fiction and non-fiction books whilst teaching English.

Stephenson died in 1957 at the age of 87.

== Works include ==
- The Fickle Wheel: A Story of Elizabethan London, 1901
- Shakespeare's London, 1905
- The Elizabethan People, 1912
- Christie Bell of Goldenrod Valley, 1918

== Gallery ==
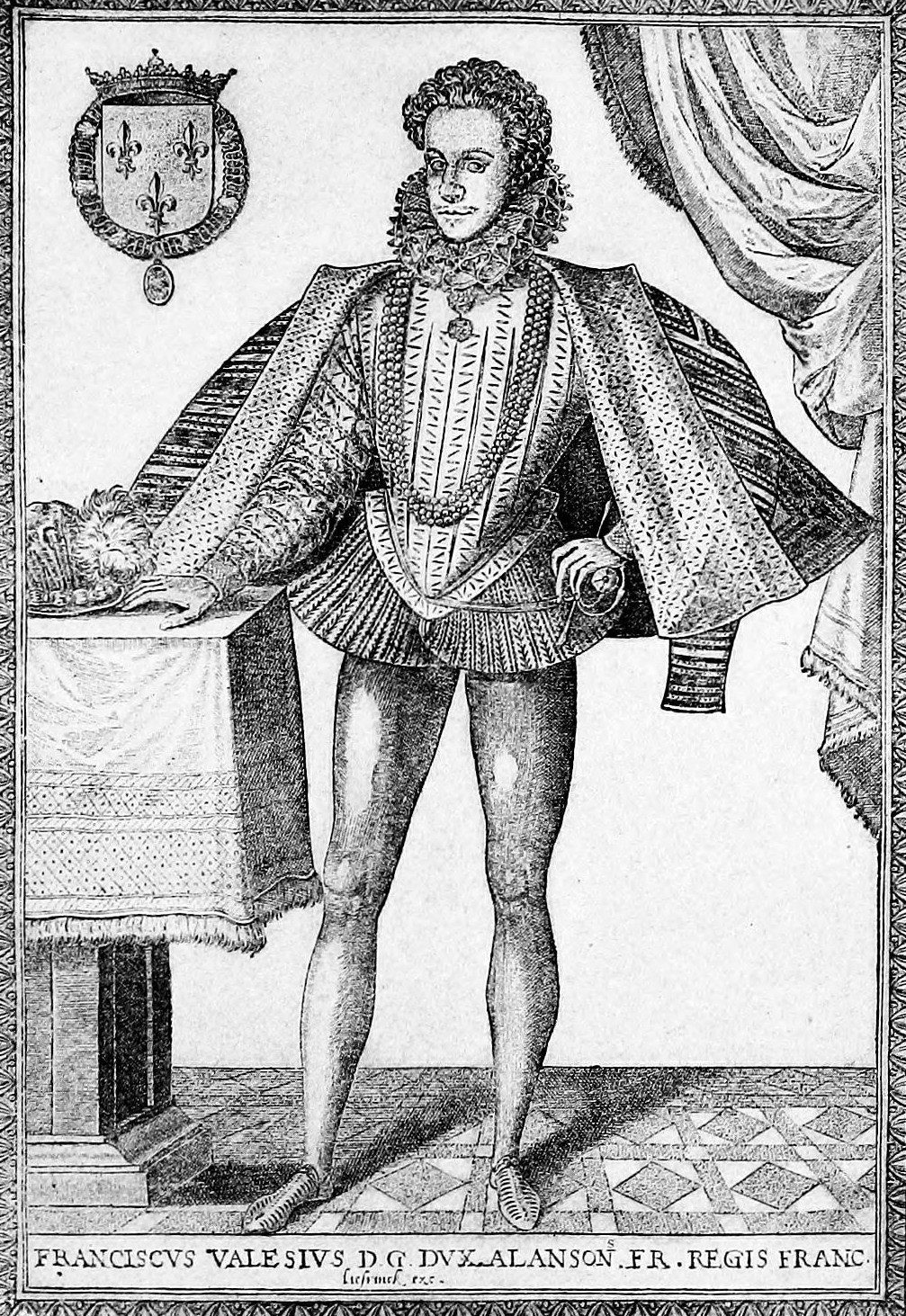
Illustrative of short hose and cape, "The Elizabethan People" by Henry Thew Stephenson

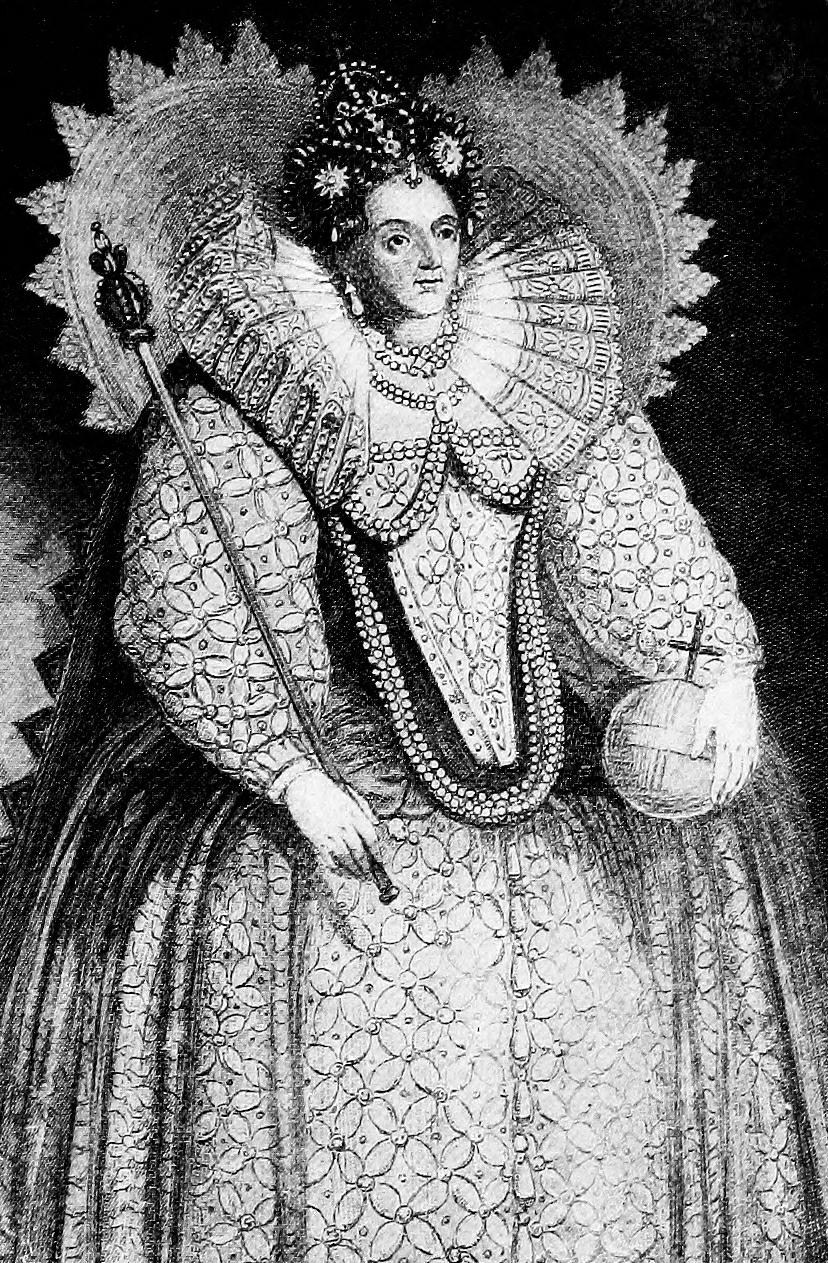
Illustrative of the large farthingale, "The Elizabethan People" by Henry Thew Stephenson
