= List of people executed in Massachusetts =

This is a list of people executed in the U.S. state of Massachusetts. At least 354 people were executed in Massachusetts. Capital punishment in Massachusetts was ruled unconstitutional in 1984 and effectively abolished in 2014.

== 1630–1699 ==
Slave executions
Executions by firing squad

Name	Race	Age	Sex	Date of execution	County	Crime	Victim(s)	Governor
John Billington	White	40	M	September 30, 1630	Plymouth	Murder	John Newcomen, white	William Bradford
John Williams	White		M	September 28, 1637	Suffolk	Murder-Robbery	Male, white	John Winthrop
William Schooler	White		M	September 28, 1637	Suffolk	Murder	Female, white	John Winthrop
Thomas Jackson	White		M	September 4, 1638	Plymouth	Murder-Robbery	Penowanyanquis, Native American	Thomas Prence
Arthur Peach	White	18	M	September 4, 1638	Plymouth	Murder-Robbery	Penowanyanquis, Native American	Thomas Prence
Richard Stinnings	White		M	September 4, 1638	Plymouth	Murder-Robbery	Penowanyanquis, Native American	Thomas Prence
Dorothy Talbye	White		F	December 6, 1638	Suffolk	Murder	Difficulty Talbye, 3, white (daughter)	John Winthrop
William Hackett	White	18	M	December 10, 1641	Suffolk	Bestiality		Richard Bellingham
Thomas Graunger	White	17	M	September 8, 1642	Plymouth	Bestiality	Several animals (Note: A mare, a cow, two goats, several sheep, two calves, and a turkey.)	John Winthrop
James Britton	White		M	March 21, 1644	Suffolk	Adultery	N/A	John Winthrop
Mary Latham	White	18	F	March 21, 1644	Suffolk	Adultery	N/A	John Winthrop
William Franklin	White		M	April 8, 1644	Suffolk	Murder	Samuel Sewell, white	John Winthrop
Mary Martin	White	22	F	March 18, 1647	Suffolk	Murder	Unknown, infant, white (illegitimate child)	John Winthrop
Margaret Jones	White	35	F	June 15, 1648	Suffolk	Witchcraft	N/A	John Winthrop
Alice Bishop	White		F	October 4, 1648	Plymouth	Murder	Martha Clarke, 4, white (daughter)	William Bradford
Alice Lake	White		F	1650	Suffolk	Witchcraft	N/A	John Endecott or Thomas Dudley
Elizabeth Kendall	White		F	1651	Middlesex	Witchcraft	N/A	John Endecott or Thomas Dudley
Mary Parsons	White		F	May 29, 1651	Suffolk	Witchcraft	N/A (Note: Also confessed to murdering her child.)	John Endecott
Ann Hibbens	White		F	June 19, 1656	Suffolk	Witchcraft	N/A	John Endecott
William Robinson	White		M	January 22, 1659	Suffolk	Quaker beliefs	N/A	John Endecott
Marmaduke Stevenson	White		M	January 22, 1659	Suffolk	Quaker beliefs	N/A	John Endecott
Mary Dyer	White	49	F	June 1, 1660	Suffolk	Quaker beliefs	N/A	John Endecott
William Leddra	White		M	March 14, 1661	Suffolk	Quaker beliefs	N/A	John Endecott
Samuel Bellamy	White		M	1661	Suffolk	Piracy		John Endecott
Unknown	White		M	1670	Suffolk	Theft		Richard Bellingham
Matoonas	Native American		M	October 1670	Suffolk	Murder	Zachariah Smith, white	Richard Bellingham
William Forrest	White		M	1672	Suffolk	Piracy		Bellingham or Leverett
Alexander Wilson	White		M	1672	Suffolk	Piracy		Bellingham or Leverett
John Smith	White		M	1672	Suffolk	Piracy		Bellingham or Leverett
Tom	Native American		M	1674		Rape	Female, Native American	John Leverett
Unknown	White		M	January 18, 1674	Suffolk	Murder		John Leverett
Unknown	White		M	January 18, 1674	Suffolk	Murder		John Leverett
Benjamin Gourd	White	17	M	April 2, 1674	Suffolk	Bestiality		John Leverett
Nicholas Feavor	White		M	March 18, 1675	Suffolk	Murder	Male, white	John Leverett
Robert Driver	White		M	March 18, 1675	Suffolk	Murder	Male, white	John Leverett
Tobias	Native American		M	June 8, 1675	Plymouth	Murder	John Sassamon, 55, Native American	Josiah Winslow
Mattashunnamo	Native American		M	June 8, 1675	Plymouth	Murder	John Sassamon, 55, Native American	Josiah Winslow
Wampapaquan	Native American		M	June 8, 1675	Plymouth	Murder	John Sassamon, 55, Native American	Josiah Winslow
John Littlejohn	Native American		M	September 22, 1675	Suffolk	Murder	Several people, white	John Leverett
Samuel Guile	White		M	October 16, 1675	Suffolk	Rape	Mary Nash, white	John Leverett
Captain Tom	Native American		M	June 22, 1676	Suffolk	Sedition		John Leverett
Unknown	Native American		M	June 22, 1676	Suffolk	Sedition		John Leverett
Three unknowns	Native American		M	July 9, 1676	Plymouth	Sedition		Josiah Winslow
Old Matoonas	Native American		M	July 27, 1676	Suffolk	Murder	Several people, white	John Leverett
Three unknowns	Native American		M	September 1, 1676	Suffolk	Sedition		John Leverett
Eight unknowns	Native American		M	September 13, 1676	Suffolk			John Leverett
Stephen Goble	White		M	September 21, 1676	Suffolk	Murder	Three women and three children, Native American	John Leverett
Daniel Goble	White		M	September 26, 1676	Suffolk	Murder	Three women and three children, Native American	John Leverett
Jethro	Native American		M	September 26, 1676	Suffolk			John Leverett
One-Eyed John	Native American		M	September 26, 1676	Suffolk			John Leverett
Maliompe	Native American		M	September 26, 1676	Suffolk			John Leverett
Sagamore Sam	Native American		M	September 26, 1676	Suffolk			John Leverett
Caleb	Native American		M	October 12, 1676	Suffolk	Sedition		John Leverett
Columbine	Native American		M	October 12, 1676	Suffolk	Sedition		John Leverett
Six unknowns	Native American		M	October 12, 1676	Plymouth	Sedition		Josiah Winslow
Marja (Note: Executed by burning.)	Black		F	September 22, 1681	Suffolk	Arson	Joshua Lambe (owner) and Thomas Swann, white	Simon Bradstreet
Jack	Black		M	September 22, 1681	Suffolk	Arson	Lt. William Clark, white	Simon Bradstreet
William Cheney	White		M	September 22, 1681	Suffolk	Rape	Experience Holdbrooke, white	Simon Bradstreet
Mrs. Henry Lake	White		F	1684	Suffolk	Witchcraft	N/A	Simon Bradstreet
James Morgan	White		M	March 11, 1685	Suffolk	Murder	Male, white	Simon Bradstreet
John Neponet	Native American		M	November 18, 1686	Suffolk	Murder	Old Aquitto and his wife, Native American	Dominion of New England
Ann Glover	White		F	November 16, 1688	Suffolk	Witchcraft	N/A	Dominion of New England
Samuel Watts	White		M	January 27, 1689	Suffolk	Murder-Piracy	Samuel Pease, white	Dominion of New England
Thomas Johnson	White		M	January 27, 1689	Suffolk	Piracy		Dominion of New England
Pammatoock	Native American		M	September 26, 1689	Dukes (Note: Then part of the Province of New York.)	Murder	Female, Native American	Francis Nicholson
Hugh Stone	White		M	January 2, 1690	Essex	Murder	Hannah Stone, white (wife)	Simon Bradstreet
John de la Forest	White		M	July 31, 1690	Plymouth (Note: Tried and convicted in Bristol, now part of Rhode Island.)	Murder	Male, white	Simon Bradstreet
Bridget Bishop	White	60	F	June 10, 1692	Essex	Witchcraft	N/A	Simon Bradstreet
Rebecca Nurse	White	71	F	July 19, 1692	Essex	Witchcraft	N/A	Simon Bradstreet
Susannah Martin	White	71	F	July 19, 1692	Essex	Witchcraft	N/A	Simon Bradstreet
Elizabeth Howe	White	57	F	July 19, 1692	Essex	Witchcraft	N/A	Simon Bradstreet
Sarah Wildes	White	65	F	July 19, 1692	Essex	Witchcraft	N/A	Simon Bradstreet
Sarah Good	White	39	F	July 19, 1692	Essex	Witchcraft	N/A	Simon Bradstreet
George Jacobs Sr.	White	83	M	August 19, 1692	Essex	Witchcraft	N/A	Simon Bradstreet
John Willard	White	35	M	August 19, 1692	Essex	Witchcraft	N/A	Simon Bradstreet
John Proctor	White	60	M	August 19, 1692	Essex	Witchcraft	N/A	Simon Bradstreet
Martha Carrier	White	42	F	August 19, 1692	Essex	Witchcraft	N/A	Simon Bradstreet
George Burroughs	White	40	M	August 19, 1692	Essex	Witchcraft	N/A	Simon Bradstreet
Giles Corey	White	81	M	September 16, 1692 (Note: Executed by crushing.)	Essex	Witchcraft	N/A	Simon Bradstreet
Mary Parker	White	55	F	September 22, 1692	Essex	Witchcraft	N/A	Simon Bradstreet
Alice Parker	White		F	September 22, 1692	Essex	Witchcraft	N/A	Simon Bradstreet
Mary Eastey	White	58	F	September 22, 1692	Essex	Witchcraft	N/A	Simon Bradstreet
Martha Corey	White	72	F	September 22, 1692	Essex	Witchcraft	N/A	Simon Bradstreet
Ann Pudeator	White	70	F	September 22, 1692	Essex	Witchcraft	N/A	Simon Bradstreet
Wilmot Redd	White		F	September 22, 1692	Essex	Witchcraft	N/A	Simon Bradstreet
Margaret Scott	White	76	F	September 22, 1692	Essex	Witchcraft	N/A	Simon Bradstreet
Samuel Wardwell	White	49	M	September 22, 1692	Essex	Witchcraft	N/A	Simon Bradstreet
Elizabeth Emmerson	White	28	F	June 8, 1693	Suffolk	Murder	Two unknown, infants, white (illegitimate children)	Simon Bradstreet
Grace	Black		F	June 8, 1693	Suffolk	Murder	Unknown, infant, black (child)	Simon Bradstreet
Zachary	Native American		M	1694	Suffolk	Murder		Phips or Stoughton
Susanna Andrews	White		F	March 31, 1696	Plymouth	Concealing birth	Male and female, infants, white (Susanna's children)	William Stoughton
Esther Andrews	White		F	March 31, 1696	Plymouth	Concealing birth	Male and female, infants, white (Susanna's children)	William Stoughton
John Andrews	White		M	March 31, 1696	Plymouth	Concealing birth	Male and female, infants, white (Susanna's children)	William Stoughton
Mowenas	Native American		M	October 23, 1696	Hampshire	Murder		William Stoughton
Moquolas	Native American		M	October 23, 1696	Hampshire	Murder		William Stoughton
Sarah Smith	White		F	August 25, 1698	Hampden	Murder		William Stoughton
Sarah Threeneedles	White		F	November 17, 1698	Suffolk	Murder	Her children, white	William Stoughton

== 1700–1799 ==
Name	Race	Age	Sex	Date of execution	County	Crime	Victim(s)	Governor
Esther Rodgers	White	21	F	July 15, 1701	Essex	Murder	Female, newborn, white (illegitimate daughter)	Governor's Council
Finch	Native American		M	1704	Nantucket	Murder	Female, Native American (wife)	Joseph Dudley
John Lambert	White		M	June 30, 1704	Suffolk	Piracy	Capt. Daniel Plowman, white	Joseph Dudley
John Miller	White		M	June 30, 1704	Suffolk	Piracy	Capt. Daniel Plowman, white	Joseph Dudley
Erastus Petersen	White		M	June 30, 1704	Suffolk	Piracy	Capt. Daniel Plowman, white	Joseph Dudley
John Quelch	White		M	June 30, 1704	Suffolk	Piracy	Capt. Daniel Plowman, white	Joseph Dudley
Peter Roach	White		M	June 30, 1704	Suffolk	Piracy	Capt. Daniel Plowman, white	Joseph Dudley
Christopher Scudamore	White		M	June 30, 1704	Suffolk	Piracy	Capt. Daniel Plowman, white	Joseph Dudley
Rochester	Black		M	November 23, 1705	Suffolk	Arson	Elizabeth Savage, white	Joseph Dudley
Mingo	Black		M	February 12, 1712	Middlesex	Rape	Abigail Hawse, 13, white	Joseph Dudley
Betty	Black		F	May 7, 1712	Plymouth	Murder	Unknown, infant, black (child)	Joseph Dudley
David Wallis	White		M	September 24, 1713	Suffolk	Murder	Benjamin Stoddard, white	Joseph Dudley
Margaret Callahan	White		F	June 4, 1715	Suffolk	Murder	Female, newborn, white (illegitimate daughter)	Joseph Dudley
Welcome	Black		M	May 18, 1716	Suffolk	Burglary	Ruth Everton, white	William Tailer
Jeremiah Fenwick	White		M	June 13, 1717	Suffolk	Murder	Ralph Mottershed, white	Samuel Shute
Thomas Baker	White		M	November 15, 1717	Suffolk	Piracy		Samuel Shute
Peter Hoof	White		M	November 15, 1717	Suffolk	Piracy		Samuel Shute
John Brown	White		M	November 15, 1717	Suffolk	Piracy		Samuel Shute
John Shuan	White		M	November 15, 1717	Suffolk	Piracy		Samuel Shute
Simon Van Vorst	White		M	November 15, 1717	Suffolk	Piracy		Samuel Shute
Hendrick Quintos	White		M	November 15, 1717	Suffolk	Piracy		Samuel Shute
Joseph Pease Jr.	Native American		M	May 18, 1720	Barnstable	Burglary	Rebecca Sturgis, white	Samuel Shute
Elizabeth Atwood	White		F	August 25, 1720	Essex	Murder	Unknown, infant, white (child)	Samuel Shute
Joseph Hanno	Black		M	May 25, 1721	Suffolk	Murder	Female, black (wife)	Samuel Shute
Joseph Ewitt	Native American		M	May 13, 1723	Barnstable	Murder	Hosea Pilate, white	William Dummer
Diego	Black		M	July 4, 1723	Suffolk	Arson	John Powell, white (owner)	William Dummer
John Archer	White	27	M	June 2, 1724	Suffolk	Piracy		William Dummer
William White	White	22	M	June 2, 1724	Suffolk	Piracy		William Dummer
Jonah Challenge	Native American		M	May 25, 1725	Dukes	Murder	Isaac Monoquit, Native American	William Dummer
Samuel Cole	White		M	July 12, 1726	Suffolk	Piracy	Capt. John Green, white	William Dummer
William Fly	White		M	July 12, 1726	Suffolk	Piracy	Capt. John Green, white	William Dummer
Henry Grenvil	White		M	July 12, 1726	Suffolk	Piracy	Capt. John Green, white	William Dummer
John Battles	White		M	October 4, 1726	Suffolk	Piracy		William Dummer
John Battles Jr.	White		M	October 4, 1726	Suffolk	Piracy		William Dummer
John Michaels	Native American		M	October 4, 1726	Suffolk	Piracy		William Dummer
James Muse	Native American		M	October 4, 1726	Suffolk	Piracy		William Dummer
Philip Muse	Native American		M	October 4, 1726	Suffolk	Piracy		William Dummer
Elizabeth Colson	Mixed (Note: Mulatta.)		F	May 25, 1727	Plymouth	Murder	Unknown, infant, mixed (child)	William Dummer
Unknown	Black		M	1729	Middlesex	Murder		William Burnet or Dummer
Joseph Fuller	White		M	May 20, 1730	Barnstable	Murder	Female, white (wife)	William Dummer
Tom	Black		M	February 10, 1731	Middlesex	Arson	John Hutchinson, white	Jonathan Belcher
Richard Wilson	White		M	October 13, 1732	Suffolk	Burglary		Jonathan Belcher
Simon	Black		M	November 2, 1732	Suffolk	Rape	Female, 18, white	Jonathan Belcher
Julian	Black		M	March 22, 1733	Suffolk	Murder	John Rogers, white	Jonathan Belcher
Rebecca Chamblett	White	27	F	September 27, 1733	Suffolk	Concealing birth	Male, newborn, white (illegitimate son) (Note: Stillborn or died shortly after birth.)	Jonathan Belcher
John Stoicks	White	19	M	March 21, 1734	Middlesex	Burglary	John Varnum, white	Jonathan Belcher
Amaziah Harding	White	70	M	June 5, 1734	Barnstable	Murder	Hannah Rogers Harding, white (wife)	Jonathan Belcher
Matthew Cushing	White	22	M	October 17, 1734	Suffolk	Burglary		Jonathan Belcher
John Ormsby	White		M	October 17, 1734	Suffolk	Murder		Jonathan Belcher
London	Black		M	November 11, 1734	Suffolk	Rape	Sarah Clark, white	Jonathan Belcher
Robin Nasson	Native American		M	July 14, 1736	Nantucket	Murder	Female, Native American (wife)	Jonathan Belcher
Hugh Henderson	White	30	M	November 26, 1737	Worcester	Burglary		Jonathan Belcher
Philip Kennison	White	30	M	September 13, 1738	Middlesex	Burglary	James Hayes, white	Jonathan Belcher
John Comfort	Native American		M	August 22, 1739	Nantucket	Murder	Joel Elisha, Native American	Jonathan Belcher
Hepsibahand Comfort	Native American		F	August 31, 1739	Nantucket	Murder	Unknown, infant, Native American (child)	Jonathan Belcher
Unknown	Black		M	January 1741	Suffolk	Arson		Jonathan Belcher
Henry Jude	Native American		M	1742	Nantucket	Murder	Mercy Moab, Native American	William Shirley
Jabez Green	White		M	October 21, 1742	Worcester	Murder	Thomas McCluer, white	William Shirley
Morgan Fennison	White		F	April 14, 1743	Middlesex	Murder	Unknown, newborn, white (child)	William Shirley
Simon Howsean	Native American		M	August 31, 1743	Nantucket	Murder	Unknown (Note: Previously convicted of manslaughter for beating another Native, Jethro Quonset, in 1732.)	William Shirley
Edward Fitzpatrick	White		M	October 18, 1744	Worcester	Murder	Daniel Campbell, white	William Shirley
Jeffrey	Black		M	October 21, 1745	Worcester	Murder	Mrs. Sandford, white (owner)	William Shirley
James Cattee	White		M	July 24, 1746	Suffolk			William Shirley
Thomas Rigby	White		M	July 24, 1746	Suffolk			William Shirley
Peter Ferry	White		M	July 24, 1746	Suffolk			William Shirley
Elizabeth Wakefield	White		F	October 8, 1747	Middlesex	Murder	Unknown, newborn, white (illegitimate child)	William Shirley
William	Black	17	M	October 15, 1747	Suffolk	Murder	Cato, black	William Shirley
Unknown	Black		M	1749	Middlesex	Murder	Unknown, white (owner)	Shirley or Phips
Unknown	Black		F	1749	Middlesex	Murder	Unknown, white (owner)	Shirley or Phips
Old Tenor	?		M	March 31, 1750	Suffolk	Murder		Spencer Phips
Phyllis	Black	17	F	May 16, 1751	Suffolk	Murder	Unknown, infant, white	Spencer Phips
William Welch	White		M	April 11, 1754	Suffolk	Murder		William Shirley
William Weir	White		M	November 19, 1754	Suffolk	Murder		William Shirley
Mark	Black		M	September 18, 1755	Middlesex	Murder	Capt. John Codman, white (owner)	William Shirley
Phillis	Black		F	September 18, 1755	Middlesex	Murder	Capt. John Codman, white (owner)	William Shirley
John Harrington	White		M	March 17, 1757	Middlesex	Murder	Paul Learned, white	Spencer Phips
Bristol	Black	16	M	December 1, 1763	Bristol	Murder	Elizabeth McKinstray, white	Sir Francis Bernard
Joseph Lightley	White	26	M	November 21, 1765	Middlesex	Murder	Elizabeth Post, white (wife)	Sir Francis Bernard
Nathan Quibby	Native American		M	May 26, 1768	Nantucket	Murder	Three people, Native American (Note: Peleg Titus, Isaac Jeffrey, and John Charles. Charles was an accomplice to the first two murders, but was then murdered by Quibby while awaiting trial.)	Sir Francis Bernard
Arthur	Black	21	M	October 20, 1768	Worcester	Rape	Deborah Metcalfe, white	Sir Francis Bernard
Richard Ames	White		M	October 31, 1768	Suffolk	Desertion	N/A	Sir Francis Bernard
Tom Ichabod	Native American		M	1769	Nantucket			Bernard or Hutchinson
Joel Elisa	Native American		M	1769	Nantucket			Bernard or Hutchinson
William Lindsay	White		M	October 25, 1770	Worcester	Burglary		Thomas Hutchinson
William Shaw	White		M	December 13, 1770	Hampden	Murder	Edward East, white	Thomas Hutchinson
Bryan Sheehan	White	39	M	January 16, 1772	Essex	Rape	Abial Hallowell, white	Thomas Hutchinson
Levi Ames	White	21	M	October 21, 1773	Suffolk	Burglary		Thomas Hutchinson
Valentine Ducat	White	21	M	September 1, 1774	Suffolk	Desertion	N/A	Thomas Gage
William Ferguson	White	28	M	December 24, 1774	Suffolk	Desertion	N/A	Thomas Gage
Elijah Woodward	White		M	October 5, 1777	Suffolk (Military)	Desertion	N/A	N/A
William Brooks	White		M	July 2, 1778	Worcester	Murder	Joshua Spooner, white (Bathsheba's husband)	N/A
James Buchanan	White	30	M	July 2, 1778	Worcester	Murder	Joshua Spooner, white (Bathsheba's husband)	N/A
Ezra Ross	White	16	M	July 2, 1778	Worcester	Murder	Joshua Spooner, white (Bathsheba's husband)	N/A
Bathsheba Spooner	White	32	F	July 2, 1778	Worcester	Murder	Joshua Spooner, white (Bathsheba's husband)	N/A
Thomas Steele	White		M	July 7, 1778	Suffolk (Military)	Desertion	N/A	N/A
Robert Young	White	29	M	November 11, 1779	Worcester	Rape	Ms. Green, 11, white	N/A
Michael Lobidal	White		M	November 8, 1781	Hampshire	Murder	James McMullen, white	John Hancock
William Huggins	White		M	June 19, 1783	Worcester	Burglary		John Hancock
John Mansfield	White		M	June 19, 1783	Worcester	Burglary		John Hancock
Cassumo Garcelli	White	23	M	January 15, 1784	Suffolk	Murder	John Johnson, white	John Hancock
Dirick Grout	White	36	M	October 28, 1784	Suffolk	Burglary	Mrs. Eliott, white	John Hancock
Francis Coven	White	22	M	October 28, 1784	Suffolk	Burglary	Samuel Sellon, white	John Hancock
John Dixson	White		M	November 11, 1784	Bristol	Burglary	Capt. James Dagget, white	John Hancock
Alexander White	White	22	M	November 18, 1784	Middlesex	Murder-Robbery	Male, white	John Hancock
Richard Barrick	White		M	November 18, 1784	Middlesex	Robbery	Cyrus Baldwin, white	John Hancock
John Sullivan	White		M	November 18, 1784	Middlesex	Robbery	Cyrus Baldwin, white	John Hancock
Thomas Archibald	White		M	May 5, 1785	Suffolk	Burglary		Thomas Cushing
William Scott	White		M	May 5, 1785	Suffolk	Burglary		Thomas Cushing
Hannah Piggen	Native American		F	July 21, 1785	Hampshire	Concealing birth	Unknown, infant, Native American (illegitimate child)	James Bowdoin
Johnson Greene	White	29	M	August 17, 1786	Worcester	Burglary		James Bowdoin
Isaac Combs	Native American	39	M	December 21, 1786	Essex	Murder	Female, Native American (wife)	James Bowdoin
John Sheehan	White	24	M	November 22, 1787	Suffolk	Burglary	T. Elliot, white	John Hancock
John Bly	White		M	December 6, 1787	Berkshire	Burglary		John Hancock
Charles Rose	White		M	December 6, 1787	Berkshire	Burglary		John Hancock
William Clark	White		M	December 6, 1787	Hampshire			John Hancock
Joseph Taylor	White		M	May 8, 1788	Suffolk	Robbery	Mr. Cunningham, white	John Hancock
Archibald Taylor	White		M	May 8, 1788	Suffolk	Robbery	Mr. Cunningham, white	John Hancock
Abigail Converse	Mixed (Note: White and Native American, reported to be a descendant of Edward Convers.)	32	F	July 6, 1788	Hampshire	Murder	Unknown, infant, mixed (illegitimate child)	John Hancock
William Danesse	White		M	January 8, 1789	Suffolk	Robbery		John Hancock
William Smith	White		M	January 8, 1789	Suffolk	Robbery		John Hancock
Rachel Wall	White	29	F	January 8, 1789	Suffolk	Robbery	Margaret Bender, white	John Hancock
Edward V. Brown	White		M	October 14, 1790	Suffolk	Burglary		John Hancock
John Bailey	Black	19	M	October 14, 1790	Suffolk	Burglary		John Hancock
Samuel Frost	White	29	M	October 31, 1793	Worcester	Murder	Capt. Elisha Allen, white	Samuel Adams
John B. Collins	White		M	July 30, 1794	Suffolk (Federal)	Murder-Piracy		Samuel Adams
Emanuel Furtado	White		M	July 30, 1794	Suffolk (Federal)	Murder-Piracy		Samuel Adams
Augustus Palacha	White		M	July 30, 1794	Suffolk (Federal)	Murder-Piracy		Samuel Adams
Pomp	Black		M	August 6, 1795	Essex	Murder	Capt. Charles Furbush, white (owner)	Samuel Adams
Henry Blackburn	White		M	January 14, 1796	Essex	Murder-Robbery	George Wilkins, elderly, white	Samuel Adams
John Stewart	White		M	April 6, 1797	Suffolk	Burglary	Capt. Rust, white	Samuel Adams
Stephen Smith	Black		M	October 12, 1797	Suffolk	Burglary		Increase Sumner
Samuel Smith	Black	54	M	December 26, 1799	Middlesex	Burglary		Moses Gill

== 1800–1899 ==
Name	Race	Age	Sex	Date of execution	County	Crime	Victim(s)	Governor
Jason Fairbanks	White	21	M	September 10, 1801	Norfolk	Murder	Elizabeth Fales, 18, white (girlfriend)	Caleb Strong
Ebenezer Mason	White		M	October 7, 1802	Norfolk	Murder	William Pitt Allen, white (brother-in-law)	Caleb Strong
John Battles	Mixed (Note: Mulatto.)	19	M	November 8, 1804	Norfolk	Murder-Rape	Salome Talbott, 14, white	Caleb Strong
Dominic Daley	White	36	M	June 5, 1806	Hampshire	Murder-Robbery	Marcus Lyon, white	Caleb Strong
James Halligan	White	28	M	June 5, 1806	Hampshire	Murder-Robbery	Marcus Lyon, white	Caleb Strong
Ephraim Wheeler	White		M	December 6, 1806	Berkshire	Rape	Female, white (daughter)	Caleb Strong
Samuel Tully	White	42	M	December 10, 1812	Suffolk (Federal)	Piracy		Caleb Strong
Peter Pyner	Black		M	October 5, 1813	Hampshire	Rape	Female, white	Caleb Strong
Ezra Hutchinson	White		M	November 18, 1813	Berkshire	Rape	Sally Bates, white	Caleb Strong
John Goodenough	White		M	November 10, 1814	Suffolk (Military)	Desertion	N/A	Caleb Strong
Adam Wilson	White		M	November 10, 1814	Suffolk (Military)	Desertion	N/A	Caleb Strong
Henry Phillips	White		M	March 13, 1817	Suffolk	Murder	Gaspard Denegri, white	John Brooks
John Williams	White	30	M	February 10, 1819	Suffolk (Federal)	Murder-Piracy		John Brooks
Francis Fredrick	White		M	February 10, 1819	Suffolk (Federal)	Murder-Piracy		John Brooks
John Rog	White	30	M	February 10, 1819	Suffolk (Federal)	Murder-Piracy		John Brooks
Peter Peterson	White	20	M	February 10, 1819	Suffolk (Federal)	Murder-Piracy		John Brooks
Peter Johnson	Black		M	November 25, 1819	Berkshire	Rape	Charity Booth, white	John Brooks
Michael Powers	White	51	M	May 25, 1820	Suffolk	Murder	Thomas Kennedy, white	John Brooks
Warren Fawsett	White		M	June 15, 1820	Suffolk (Federal)	Piracy		John Brooks
William Holmes	White		M	June 15, 1820	Suffolk (Federal)	Piracy		John Brooks
Edward Rosewaine	White		M	June 15, 1820	Suffolk (Federal)	Piracy		John Brooks
Stephen Clarke	White	16	M	May 10, 1821	Essex	Arson	Phebe Cross, white (Note: Serial arsonist, burned nine other buildings during this crime and suspected in several previous fires.)	John Brooks
Michael Martin	White	46	M	December 20, 1821	Middlesex	Robbery	Major John Bray, white	John Brooks
Samuel Clisby	White		M	March 7, 1822	Suffolk	Robbery	Ezra Haynes, white	John Brooks
Gilbert Close	White		M	March 7, 1822	Suffolk	Robbery	Ezra Haynes, white	John Brooks
Samuel Green	White	26	M	April 25, 1822	Suffolk	Murder	Billy Williams, black (inmate)	John Brooks
Perry Anthony	Black		M	December 21, 1824	Suffolk (Federal) (Note: Crime committed in the Bay of Honduras.)	Murder	Mr. Stoddard, white	William Eustis
Horace Carter	White		M	December 7, 1825	Worcester	Rape	Ruth Ainsworth, elderly, white	Levi Lincoln Jr.
John Holloran	White		M	March 3, 1826	Suffolk	Murder	Jonathan Houghton, white (watchman)	Levi Lincoln Jr.
Samuel Chase	Native American		M	November 26, 1826	Berkshire	Murder	Joel Freeman, black	Levi Lincoln Jr.
Duncan White	White		M	February 1, 1827	Suffolk (Federal)	Piracy		Levi Lincoln Jr.
Winslow Curtis	White		M	February 1, 1827	Suffolk (Federal)	Piracy		Levi Lincoln Jr.
John Boies	White		M	July 7, 1829	Norfolk	Murder	Jane Boies, white (wife)	Levi Lincoln Jr.
John Knapp	White	20	M	September 28, 1830	Essex	Murder	Capt. Joseph White, white	Levi Lincoln Jr.
Joseph Knapp Jr.	White		M	December 31, 1830	Essex	Accessory to murder	Capt. Joseph White, white	Levi Lincoln Jr.
Joseph Gadett	Black		M	July 1, 1831	Suffolk (Federal)	Piracy		Levi Lincoln Jr.
Thomas Collinet	Black		M	July 1, 1831	Suffolk (Federal)	Piracy		Levi Lincoln Jr.
Henry Joseph	Black		M	December 2, 1834	Suffolk (Federal)	Piracy		John Davis
Pedro Gibbert	White		M	June 9, 1835	Suffolk (Federal)	Piracy		Samuel Turell Armstrong
Manuel Boyga	White		M	June 9, 1835	Suffolk (Federal)	Piracy		Samuel Turell Armstrong
Manuel Castello	White		M	June 9, 1835	Suffolk (Federal)	Piracy		Samuel Turell Armstrong
Angel Garcia	White		M	June 9, 1835	Suffolk (Federal)	Piracy		Samuel Turell Armstrong
Juan Montenegro	White		M	June 9, 1835	Suffolk (Federal)	Piracy		Samuel Turell Armstrong
Francisco Ruiz	White		M	September 12, 1835	Suffolk (Federal)	Piracy		Samuel Turell Armstrong
Simeon Crockett	White	27	M	March 16, 1836	Suffolk	Arson	N/A	Edward Everett
Stephen Russell	White		M	March 16, 1836	Suffolk	Arson	N/A	Edward Everett
James Williams	White		M	May 19, 1837	Suffolk (Federal)	Murder		Edward Everett
Benjamin Cummings	White		M	August 7, 1839	Bristol	Murder	Asa Clark Jr., white	Edward Everett
Thomas Barrett	White		M	January 3, 1845	Worcester	Murder-Rape	Ruth Houghton, 70, white	George N. Briggs
Washington Goode	Black	29	M	May 25, 1849	Suffolk	Murder	Thomas Harding, black	George N. Briggs
Daniel Pearson	White	41	M	July 20, 1850	Suffolk	Murder	Three people, white (Note: His wife Martha B. Pearson and their twin daughters, Sarah and Lydia.)	George N. Briggs
John Webster	White	57	M	August 30, 1850	Suffolk	Murder	George Parkman, 59, white	George N. Briggs
James Clough	White	29	M	April 28, 1854	Bristol	Murder	Gideon Manchester, white	Emory Washburn
Thomas Casey	White	22	M	September 29, 1854	Middlesex	Murder	Mr. and Mrs. Taylor, white	Emory Washburn
James McGee	White		M	June 25, 1858	Suffolk	Murder	Mr. Walker, white (deputy warden)	Nathaniel P. Banks
Alexander Desmarteau	White	25	M	April 26, 1861	Norfolk	Murder-Rape	Augustine Lucas, 8, white	John Albion Andrew
George Hersey	White	29	M	August 8, 1862	Norfolk	Murder	Betsy Frances Tirrell, 25, white (love interest) (Note: Also suspected of murdering his wife Emeline and Mary Tirrell, but denied both.)	John Albion Andrew
William Lynch	White		M	June 26, 1863	Suffolk (Military)	Mutiny		John Albion Andrew
James Callender	Mixed (Note: Mulatto.)		M	November 6, 1863	Berkshire	Murder-Rape	Emily Jones and her two daughters, white	John Albion Andrew
Charles Carpenter	White		M	April 22, 1864	Suffolk (Military)	Desertion	N/A	John Albion Andrew
Matthew Riley	White		M	April 22, 1864	Suffolk (Military)	Desertion	N/A	John Albion Andrew
Edward Green	White	33	M	April 13, 1866	Middlesex	Murder-Robbery	Frank E. Converse, 17, white	Alexander Bullock
Silas James	White	31	M	September 25, 1868	Worcester	Murder-Robbery	Joseph G. Clark, white	Alexander Bullock
Charles James	White	22	M	September 25, 1868	Worcester	Murder-Robbery	Joseph G. Clark, white	Alexander Bullock
James McElhaney	White		M	March 21, 1873	Suffolk	Murder	Mrs. Roberts, white (mother-in-law)	William B. Washburn
Albert Smith	White		M	June 27, 1873	Hampden	Murder	Charles D. Sackett, white	William B. Washburn
William Sturtevant	White		M	May 2, 1875	Plymouth	Murder-Burglary	Simeon Sturtevant (uncle) and Mary Buckley, white	William Gaston
James Costley	White		M	June 25, 1875	Norfolk	Murder	Julia Hawkes, white (Note: Also believed to have murdered another woman, 24-year-old Love Congdon.)	William Gaston
George Pemberton	White		M	October 8, 1875	Suffolk	Murder	Margaret Bingham, white	William Gaston
Thomas Piper	White	27	M	May 26, 1876	Suffolk	Murder-Rape	Mabel Hood Young, 5, white (Note: Suspected serial killer, also previously murdered Bridget Landregan and attempted to murder Mary Tyner.)	Alexander H. Rice
Samuel Frost	White		M	May 26, 1876	Worcester	Murder	Franklin P. Towne, white (brother-in-law)	Alexander H. Rice
John Ten Eyck	Mixed (Note: Son of a runaway slave and a woman of mixed white and native ancestry.)	46	M	August 16, 1878	Berkshire	Murder-Burglary	Mr. and Mrs. David Stillman, 80 and 70, white	Alexander H. Rice
William Devlin	White		M	March 13, 1879	Middlesex	Murder	Female, white (wife)	Thomas Talbot
Alan Adams	White	44	M	April 16, 1881	Hampshire	Murder	Moses B. Dickinson, white	John Davis Long
Joseph Loomis	White		M	March 8, 1883	Hampden	Murder-Robbery	David Levitt, white	Benjamin Butler
Charles Williams	Mixed (Note: Mulatto.)		M	January 8, 1886	Middlesex	Rape	Eliza J. Keene, white	George D. Robinson
Samuel Besse	White		M	March 10, 1887	Plymouth	Murder-Robbery	Richard N. Lawton, white	Oliver Ames
James Nowlin	White	18	M	January 20, 1888	Middlesex	Murder-Robbery	George A. Codman, 50, white	Oliver Ames
Walter Holmes	White		M	February 3, 1893	Hampden	Murder	Female, white (wife)	William E. Russell
William Coy	White		M	March 3, 1893	Berkshire	Murder	John Whalen, white	William E. Russell
Daniel Robertson	White	49	M	December 4, 1894	Bristol	Murder	Female, white (wife)	Frederic T. Greenhalge
Angus Gilbert	White		M	February 21, 1896	Suffolk	Murder-Rape	Alice Sterling, child, white	Frederic T. Greenhalge
Jack O'Neill	White		M	January 7, 1898	Franklin	Murder-Robbery	Mattie McCloud, white	Roger Wolcott
Lorenz Barnes	White		M	March 4, 1898	Middlesex	Murder-Burglary	John Dean, 75, white	Roger Wolcott
Alfred Williams	White	24	M	October 7, 1898	Essex	Murder-Robbery	John Gallo, white	Roger Wolcott
Dominique Krathofski	White	29	M	December 30, 1898	Hampden	Murder	Victoria Pinkos, 16, white (stepdaughter)	Roger Wolcott

== 1900–1947 ==
In April 1898, Massachusetts officially replaced local hangings with centralized electrocution at Charlestown State Prison, with the replacement being completed in March 1899.

Name	Race	Age	Sex	Date of execution	County	Crime	Victim(s)	Governor
Luigi Storti	White	26	M	December 17, 1901	Suffolk	Murder	Michele Calucci, 30, white	Winthrop M. Crane
Franciszek Umilian	White	34	M	December 24, 1901	Hampshire	Murder	Casimer Jedrusik, white	Winthrop M. Crane
John Cassels	White	34	M	May 6, 1902	Hampden	Murder	Mary J. Lane, white (girlfriend)	Winthrop M. Crane
John Best	White	37	M	September 9, 1902	Essex	Murder	George E. Bailey, white	Winthrop M. Crane
Charles Tucker	White	25	M	June 12, 1906	Middlesex	Murder-Burglary	Mabel Page, 41, white	Curtis Guild Jr.
John Schidlofski	White	29	M	July 9, 1906	Middlesex	Murder	Marciana Spirgis, 40, white (wife) (Note: One of his former wives also drowned under suspicious circumstances.)	Curtis Guild Jr.
Hom Woon	Asian	37	M	October 12, 1909	Suffolk	Murder	Four people, Asian (Note: Lee Kai Nom, Chin Leet, Chin Mon Quin, and Wong Shu Chung.)	Eben Sumner Draper
Min Sing	Asian	31	M	October 12, 1909	Suffolk	Murder	Four people, Asian	Eben Sumner Draper
Leong Gong	Asian	19	M	October 12, 1909	Suffolk	Murder	Four people, Asian	Eben Sumner Draper
Napoleon Rivet	White	32	M	July 28, 1910	Middlesex	Murder	Joseph J. Gailloux, 37, white	Eben Sumner Draper
Wassili Ivankowski	White	22	M	March 7, 1911	Essex	Murder-Robbery	Thomas A. Langren and James H. Carroll (police officer), white	Eugene Foss
Andrei Ipson	White	19	M	March 7, 1911	Essex	Murder-Robbery	Thomas A. Langren and James H. Carroll (police officer), white	Eugene Foss
Silas Phelps	White	39	M	January 26, 1912	Franklin	Murder	Emmett F. Haskins, white (deputy sheriff)	Eugene Foss
Clarence Richeson	White	36	M	May 21, 1912	Suffolk	Murder	Avis Willard Linnell, 17, white (fiancée)	Eugene Foss
Enrico Mascioli	White	25	M	June 6, 1912	Plymouth	Murder	Frank Cusumano, white (girlfriend's husband)	Eugene Foss
Bertram Spencer	White	31	M	September 17, 1912	Hampden	Murder-Burglary	Martha B. Blackstone, 39, white	Eugene Foss
Chester Jordan	White	33	M	September 24, 1912	Middlesex	Murder	Irene Shannon, white (wife)	Eugene Foss
Stefan Borasky	White	26	M	June 24, 1913	Hampden	Murder	Rose Amansky, white	Eugene Foss
William Dorr	White	31	M	March 24, 1914	Essex	Murder	Orpha Marsh, white (aunt)	David I. Walsh
Biago Falzone	White	23	M	May 11, 1915	Middlesex	Murder-Robbery	Maurice Albertson, white	David I. Walsh
Anton Retkovitz	White	37	M	March 16, 1916	Bristol	Murder	Domba Peremebida, white	Samuel W. McCall
Francis Ducharme	White	27	M	September 11, 1917	Hampden	Murder-Rape	Leona Kaczar, 3, white	Samuel W. McCall
Francisco Feci	White	37	M	August 16, 1920	Middlesex	Murder	Louis Fred Soulia, white	Calvin Coolidge
Paul Dascalakis	White	30	M	July 14, 1923	Suffolk	Murder	Alice Arseneault, white (girlfriend)	Channing H. Cox
Cyrille Vandenhecke	White	51	M	July 30, 1924	Essex	Murder	Gislain and Sophie Shureman (girlfriend), white	Channing H. Cox
Richard Stewart	Black	32	M	May 5, 1926	Middlesex	Murder	William James, black	Alvan T. Fuller
John McLaughlin	White	30	M	January 6, 1927	Middlesex	Murder-Robbery	James H. Ferneaux, elderly, white	Alvan T. Fuller
John Devereaux	White	25	M	January 6, 1927	Middlesex	Murder-Robbery	James H. Ferneaux, elderly, white	Alvan T. Fuller
Edward Heinlein	White	26	M	January 6, 1927	Middlesex	Murder-Robbery	James H. Ferneaux, elderly, white	Alvan T. Fuller
Bartolomeo Vanzetti	White	33	M	August 23, 1927	Norfolk	Murder-Robbery	Alessandro Berardelli and Frederick Parmenter, white	Alvan T. Fuller
Celestino Madeiros	White	24	M	August 23, 1927	Norfolk	Murder-Robbery	Alessandro Berardelli and Frederick Parmenter, white	Alvan T. Fuller
Nicola Sacco	White	36	M	August 23, 1927	Norfolk	Murder-Robbery	Alessandro Berardelli and Frederick Parmenter, white	Alvan T. Fuller
Jerry Gedzium	White	23	M	February 28, 1928	Middlesex	Murder-Robbery	Edward C. Ross, white	Alvan T. Fuller
Herbert Gleason	White	21	M	March 13, 1928	Middlesex	Murder-Robbery	John Monagle, white	Alvan T. Fuller
Nathan Desatnick	White	25	M	July 17, 1928	Worcester	Murder	Stella Desatnick, infant, white (illegitimate daughter)	Alvan T. Fuller
George Taylor	White	47	M	March 6, 1929	Essex	Murder-Rape	Stella Kale, white	Frank G. Allen
Frederick Knowlton Jr.	White	37	M	May 14, 1929	Middlesex	Murder	Marguerite Stewart, white (girlfriend)	Frank G. Allen
Charles Trippi	White	22	M	December 3, 1929	Worcester	Murder	Frederick Pfluger, white (reformatory guard)	Frank G. Allen
Paul Hurley	White	20	M	September 15, 1931	Norfolk	Murder	Joseph B. O'Brien, white (patrolman)	Joseph B. Ely
Joseph Belenski	White	38	M	October 21, 1931	Middlesex	Murder	Wincenty and Stanislawa Stefanowicz, white	Joseph B. Ely
Sylvester Fernandes	White	24	M	August 12, 1932	Barnstable	Murder-Burglary	John Alvez, white	Joseph B. Ely
Ahmed Osman	Middle Eastern	37	M	January 23, 1934	Norfolk	Murder-Rape	Nellie Keras, 9, white	Joseph B. Ely
Henry Bull	White	22	M	February 22, 1934	Franklin	Murder	Albert C. Jordan, white (patrolman)	Joseph B. Ely
Herman Snyder	White	21	M	February 22, 1934	Middlesex	Murder	James M. Kiley, white	Joseph B. Ely
John Donnellon	White	24	M	February 22, 1934	Middlesex	Murder	James M. Kiley, white	Joseph B. Ely
Alexander Kaminski	White	25	M	February 19, 1935	Hampden	Murder	Merritt W. Hayden, white (prison guard)	James Michael Curley
Abraham Faber	White	25	M	June 7, 1935	Norfolk	Murder-Robbery	Forbes McLeod and Frank Haddock, white (police officers) (Note: Serial killers, also previously murdered Edmund Leary and an elderly theater employee.)	James Michael Curley
Irving Millen	White	22	M	June 7, 1935	Norfolk	Murder-Robbery	Forbes McLeod and Frank Haddock, white (police officers)	James Michael Curley
Murton Millen	White	25	M	June 7, 1935	Norfolk	Murder-Robbery	Forbes McLeod and Frank Haddock, white (police officers)	James Michael Curley
Miller Clark	White	44	M	January 14, 1936	Suffolk	Murder-Rape	Ethel Zuckerman, white	James Michael Curley
Newell Sherman	White	27	M	August 4, 1936	Worcester	Murder	Alice Dudley Sherman, white (wife)	James Michael Curley
Anthony DiStasio	White	25	M	January 18, 1938	Middlesex	Murder	Daniel Crowley, white	Charles F. Hurley
Frank DiStasio	White	52	M	January 18, 1938	Middlesex	Murder	Daniel Crowley, white	Charles F. Hurley
Edward Simpson	White	43	M	May 13, 1938	Middlesex	Murder	Henry G. Bell and Lawrence E. Murphy, white (patrolman and motorcycle officer)	Charles F. Hurley
Walter St. Saveur	White	22	M	August 2, 1939	Middlesex	Murder-Robbery	William Phillips, white	Leverett Saltonstall
Wallace Green	White	22	M	August 2, 1939	Middlesex	Murder-Robbery	William Phillips, white	Leverett Saltonstall
Leo Rousseau	White	29	M	April 22, 1941	Norfolk	Murder	Edward D. Lee, white (patrolman)	Leverett Saltonstall
Paul Giacomazza	White	19	M	June 30, 1942	Middlesex	Murder	Oscar E. Thomas, 74, white	Leverett Saltonstall
James Nickerson	White	22	M	June 30, 1942	Middlesex	Murder	Oscar E. Thomas, 74, white	Leverett Saltonstall
Joseph Sheppard	White	25	M	June 25, 1943	Plymouth	Murder	George Landry, 64, white (guard) (Note: Also murdered two other guards, 63-year-old Franklin Weston and 42-year-old Howard V. Murphy, during the crime.)	Leverett Saltonstall
Donald Millard	White	19	M	June 25, 1943	Plymouth	Murder	George Landry, 64, white (guard)	Leverett Saltonstall
Robert Gray	Black	34	M	June 25, 1943	Suffolk	Murder-Burglary	Zelda Karchmer, 26, white	Leverett Saltonstall
Raphael Skopp	White	36	M	August 16, 1946	Suffolk	Murder-Robbery	Bronislaw Pertrusevitz, 53, white	Maurice J. Tobin
Phillip Bellino	White	32	M	May 9, 1947	Essex	Murder	Robert Williams, 19, white	Robert F. Bradford
Edward Gertson	White	35	M	May 9, 1947	Essex	Murder	Robert Williams, 19, white	Robert F. Bradford
