= List of people executed in the United States in 1947 =

One hundred and fifty-eighty people, one hundred and fifty-six male and two female, were executed in the United States in 1947, 113 by electrocution, thirty-six by gas chamber, and nine by hanging.

Massachusetts carried out its last executions this year before abolishing the death penalty in 1984. South Dakota conducted its first and only execution by electrocution, that of George Sitts. Sitts was also the first person to be executed in South Dakota since 1913. The state had reinstated the death penalty in 1939 after initially abolishing it in 1915.

James Lewis Jr. became the last person to be executed in the United States for a crime committed at the age of 14.

== List of people executed in the United States in 1947 ==
No.	Date of execution	Name	Age of person			Gender	Ethnicity	State	Method	Ref.
No.	Date of execution	Name	At execution	At offense	Age difference	Gender	Ethnicity	State	Method	Ref.
1	January 2, 1947	Ronald Joseph Watson	21	20	1	Male	White	Vermont	Electrocution	
2	January 3, 1947	Cleve Covington	26	25	1	Male	Black	South Carolina	Electrocution	
3	January 3, 1947	Amon J. Gusler	52	52	0	Male	White	Virginia	Electrocution	
4	January 3, 1947	William Gordon	20	20	0	Male	White	West Virginia	Hanging	
5	January 7, 1947	John Henry Clark	27	26	1	Male	Black	Washington	Hanging	
6	January 9, 1947	Van Lee Ramsey	36	35	1	Male	Black	Missouri	Gas chamber	
7	January 10, 1947	Clifton Holmes	26	Unknown	Unknown	Male	Black	Arkansas	Electrocution	
8	January 10, 1947	Paul Maynard Skaug	25	23	2	Male	White	Nevada	Gas chamber	
9	January 17, 1947	Albert Hodges	27	Unknown	Unknown	Male	Black	Arkansas	Electrocution	
10	January 17, 1947	Charles Lee Carmen	20	20	0	Male	Black	Maryland	Hanging	
11	January 17, 1947	Rose Marie Stinette	49	Unknown	Unknown	Female	Black	South Carolina	Electrocution	
12	January 24, 1947	Jeff Henley Jr.	20	19	1	Male	Black	Arkansas	Electrocution	
13	January 24, 1947	Marshall Perkins	60	59	1	Male	Black	Missouri	Gas chamber	
14	January 30, 1947	Harlan Broyles	32	30	2	Male	White	Oklahoma	Electrocution	
15	February 7, 1947	John Thomas Honeycutt	33	32	1	Male	White	California	Gas chamber	
16	February 8, 1947	Arthur Brown Jr.	20	Unknown	Unknown	Male	Black	Georgia	Electrocution	
17	February 8, 1947	Morris Dorsey	23	Unknown	Unknown	Male	Black	Georgia	Electrocution	
18	February 14, 1947	Robert Jordon	21	Unknown	Unknown	Male	Black	South Carolina	Electrocution	
19	February 24, 1947	Peter J. Ewell Jr.	24	23	1	Male	Black	Pennsylvania	Electrocution	
20	February 24, 1947	Allen Wesley Black	28	28	0	Male	White	Pennsylvania	Electrocution	
21	February 26, 1947	Thomas Clayton Hilton	30	29	1	Male	White	California	Gas chamber	
22	March 3, 1947	Samuel H. Jones	42	41	1	Male	Black	Pennsylvania	Electrocution	
23	March 6, 1947	Edward Kahkoska	22	21	1	Male	White	New York	Electrocution	
24	March 6, 1947	Edward Koberski	23	22	1	Male	White	New York	Electrocution	
25	March 6, 1947	Henry Paul Suckow Jr.	25	24	1	Male	White	New York	Electrocution	
26	March 14, 1947	Booker T. Brooks	31	23	8	Male	Black	Alabama	Electrocution	
27	March 14, 1947	Otis Ragland	30	30	0	Male	Black	North Carolina	Gas chamber	
28	March 17, 1947	Wilbur Paul Patterson	24	21	3	Male	White	Florida	Electrocution	
29	March 21, 1947	Alger Simmons	32	29	3	Male	Black	California	Gas chamber	
30	March 21, 1947	L. D. Henderson	21	Unknown	Unknown	Male	Black	Texas	Electrocution	
31	March 28, 1947	Benny Harris Montgomery	23	23	0	Male	Black	North Carolina	Gas chamber	
32	April 1, 1947	Phillmond H. Zachary Jr.	27	26	1	Male	Black	Texas	Electrocution	
33	April 2, 1947	Russell Eugene Koons	23	22	1	Male	White	Ohio	Electrocution	
34	April 4, 1947	Richard Horton	24	23	1	Male	Black	North Carolina	Gas chamber	
35	April 8, 1947	George Sidney Sitts	33	32	1	Male	White	South Dakota	Electrocution	
36	April 11, 1947	Louise M. Peete	66	63	3	Female	White	California	Gas chamber	
37	April 11, 1947	Amos Batt	19	19	0	Male	Black	Louisiana	Electrocution	
38	April 11, 1947	Eunice Martin	30	29	1	Male	Black	North Carolina	Gas chamber	
39	April 11, 1947	Albert Eugene Dubois	37	36	1	Male	White	Tennessee	Electrocution	
40	April 16, 1947	Fred Womack Jr.	22	Unknown	Unknown	Male	Black	Ohio	Electrocution	
41	April 17, 1947	Arthur Johnson	21	20	1	Male	Black	New York	Electrocution	
42	April 17, 1947	William Washington	28	27	1	Male	Black	New York	Electrocution	
43	April 18, 1947	Homer Reginald Knapp	38	38	0	Male	White	Georgia	Electrocution	
44	April 18, 1947	Talmage Haggins	25	24	1	Male	Black	South Carolina	Electrocution	
45	April 21, 1947	Lewis Green	19	18	1	Male	Black	Florida	Electrocution	
46	April 22, 1947	Garlon Mickles	23	22	1	Male	Black	U.S. military	Hanging	
47	April 25, 1947	Willis Donald Barnes	29	27	2	Male	White	Georgia	Electrocution	
48	April 25, 1947	Lauren Porter	38	Unknown	Unknown	Male	Black	Georgia	Electrocution	
49	April 25, 1947	Walton Ratcliff	25	24	1	Male	Black	Mississippi	Electrocution	
50	April 25, 1947	Freddie Jones	19	Unknown	Unknown	Male	Black	South Carolina	Electrocution	
51	April 28, 1947	David H. Brooks	23	21	2	Male	Black	Pennsylvania	Electrocution	
52	April 28, 1947	Albert Wooding	23	21	2	Male	Black	Pennsylvania	Electrocution	
53	May 2, 1947	Quiller Daniel	30	29	1	Male	Black	Georgia	Electrocution	
54	May 2, 1947	Webber Atwood	24	20	4	Male	White	Louisiana	Electrocution	
55	May 2, 1947	John Dickerson	36	35	1	Male	Black	South Carolina	Electrocution	
56	May 2, 1947	Huey Wilson	37	36	1	Male	Black	Texas	Electrocution	
57	May 7, 1947	Alonzo Ellis Jones	27	26	1	Male	White	Louisiana	Electrocution	
58	May 9, 1947	Willie Francis	18	15	3	Male	Black	Louisiana	Electrocution	
59	May 9, 1947	Philip R. Bellino	30	28	2	Male	White	Massachusetts	Electrocution	
60	May 9, 1947	Edward F. Gertson	34	32	2	Male	White	Massachusetts	Electrocution	
61	May 16, 1947	Vollie Bill Bates	20	19	1	Male	White	Arkansas	Electrocution	
62	May 16, 1947	Donnie Mitchell	49	48	1	Male	Black	Louisiana	Electrocution	
63	May 23, 1947	Israel Garrett	45	43	2	Male	Black	Alabama	Electrocution	
64	May 23, 1947	John Henry Brown	49	46	2	Male	Black	Colorado	Gas chamber	
65	May 23, 1947	Ben Frank McLeod	Unknown	Unknown	Unknown	Male	Black	North Carolina	Gas chamber	
66	May 23, 1947	Ephraim Thomas	27	Unknown	Unknown	Male	Black	Virginia	Electrocution	
67	May 29, 1947	Oscar E. Allen	45	44	1	Male	Black	Texas	Electrocution	
68	June 2, 1947	Louis Jones	29	27	2	Male	Black	Texas	Electrocution	
69	June 5, 1947	Nathaniel Freeman	25	24	1	Male	Black	Ohio	Electrocution	
70	June 6, 1947	Ernest Nathaniel Dunn	38	37	1	Male	White	California	Gas chamber	
71	June 6, 1947	James Marvin Farmer	20	19	1	Male	Black	North Carolina	Gas chamber	
72	June 6, 1947	Albert Sanders	21	20	1	Male	Black	North Carolina	Gas chamber	
73	June 7, 1947	William Alfred Norris	23	22	1	Male	Black	Texas	Electrocution	
74	June 13, 1947	Louis Young	47	45	2	Male	Black	New Mexico	Electrocution	
75	June 16, 1947	Leroy Henderson	36	Unknown	Unknown	Male	Black	Florida	Electrocution	
76	June 17, 1947	James Brown	25	25	0	Male	Black	Georgia	Electrocution	
77	June 19, 1947	John Hodge Jr.	28	27	1	Male	Black	Tennessee	Electrocution	
78	June 20, 1947	Harold O. Gillette	31	30	1	Male	White	Colorado	Gas chamber	
79	June 20, 1947	Charles Crosby	37	36	1	Male	Black	Illinois	Electrocution	
80	June 20, 1947	William A. Davis	24	24	0	Male	Black	South Carolina	Electrocution	
81	June 26, 1947	Charlie Allen	37	36	1	Male	Black	Texas	Electrocution	
82	June 27, 1947	William Edward Copper	21	20	1	Male	Black	Maryland	Hanging	
83	June 27, 1947	Moses Artis	42	41	1	Male	Black	North Carolina	Gas chamber	
84	June 27, 1947	Roy Kirksey	26	24	2	Male	Black	North Carolina	Gas chamber	
85	June 27, 1947	Woodrow Brown	26	25	1	Male	Black	North Carolina	Gas chamber	
86	June 30, 1947	Herbert Lee Reddick	17	16	1	Male	Black	Georgia	Electrocution	
87	July 3, 1947	Ward Beecher Caraway	23	22	1	Male	Black	New York	Electrocution	
88	July 10, 1947	Salvatore DiCristofaro	34	33	1	Male	White	New York	Electrocution	
89	July 10, 1947	Edward Jones	22	20	2	Male	Black	New York	Electrocution	
90	July 10, 1947	Arnold Simms	23	21	2	Male	Black	New York	Electrocution	
91	July 10, 1947	William J. Thomas	20	18	2	Male	Black	New York	Electrocution	
92	July 11, 1947	Earl L. Tunget	23	21	2	Male	White	Kentucky	Electrocution	
93	July 11, 1947	Hillery Ledet	20	18	2	Male	Black	Louisiana	Electrocution	
94	July 11, 1947	Henry Scott	25	25	0	Male	Black	Louisiana	Electrocution	
95	July 11, 1947	J. C. Sims	33	33	0	Male	Black	South Carolina	Electrocution	
96	July 18, 1947	Jessie Perkins	41	Unknown	Unknown	Male	Black	Louisiana	Electrocution	
97	July 18, 1947	William Davis	43	42	1	Male	Black	Virginia	Electrocution	
98	July 23, 1947	James Lewis Jr.	15	14	1	Male	Black	Mississippi	Electrocution	
99	July 23, 1947	Charles Trudell	16	15	1	Male	Black	Mississippi	Electrocution	
100	July 25, 1947	Bert Junior Grant	18	18	0	Male	Black	South Carolina	Electrocution	
101	July 29, 1947	George F. Gumtow	21	21	0	Male	White	Kansas	Hanging	
102	July 29, 1947	Cecil Tate	22	22	0	Male	White	Kansas	Hanging	
103	July 30, 1947	Clarence Dampier	22	21	1	Male	Black	Mississippi	Electrocution	
104	August 1, 1947	Ebenezer Scott	27	Unknown	Unknown	Male	Black	Georgia	Electrocution	
105	August 1, 1947	Robert Lee Stanford	25	23	2	Male	Black	Georgia	Electrocution	
106	August 1, 1947	Ross Jerome Abbott	25	24	1	Male	White	Maryland	Hanging	
107	August 1, 1947	Weldon Jones Jr.	20	18	2	Male	Black	Maryland	Hanging	
108	August 1, 1947	William Pooler	24	24	0	Male	Black	South Carolina	Electrocution	
109	August 4, 1947	Joe Ferguson	42	41	1	Male	Black	Florida	Electrocution	
110	August 4, 1947	James Andrew Maxwell	31	30	1	Male	Black	Florida	Electrocution	
111	August 4, 1947	Tom Melton	32	31	1	Male	Black	Florida	Electrocution	
112	August 8, 1947	Cubie Lee Johnson	24	23	1	Male	Black	Arkansas	Electrocution	
113	August 8, 1947	Lawrence William Dukes	40	40	0	Male	Black	Arkansas	Electrocution	
114	August 9, 1947	Terrell Loughridge	29	27	2	Male	White	Georgia	Electrocution	
115	August 11, 1947	Fred Jackson	18	16	2	Male	Black	Tennessee	Electrocution	
116	August 13, 1947	Roosevelt Moore	26	Unknown	Unknown	Male	Black	Georgia	Electrocution	
117	August 15, 1947	Leonard Pringle	25	25	0	Male	Black	South Carolina	Electrocution	
118	August 15, 1947	Ernest Willis	25	Unknown	Unknown	Male	Black	South Carolina	Electrocution	
119	August 21, 1947	Webster Daniel	37	Unknown	Unknown	Male	Black	New York	Electrocution	
120	August 29, 1947	Joe Caetano	35	33	2	Male	White	California	Gas chamber	
121	September 5, 1947	Arthur Adams	37	36	1	Male	Black	Texas	Electrocution	
122	September 12, 1947	Elijah Pearson	46	45	1	Male	Black	Texas	Electrocution	
123	September 26, 1947	Floyd P. Cochran	36	34	2	Male	Black	Missouri	Gas chamber	
124	September 29, 1947	Joshua Elwood Beatty	47	46	1	Male	White	Pennsylvania	Electrocution	
125	October 3, 1947	Richard McCain	21	20	1	Male	Black	North Carolina	Gas chamber	
126	October 3, 1947	Jethro Lampkin	20	19	1	Male	Black	North Carolina	Gas chamber	
127	October 3, 1947	Robert Messer	21	21	0	Male	White	North Carolina	Gas chamber	
128	October 3, 1947	Earl Leonard O'Dear	23	23	0	Male	White	North Carolina	Gas chamber	
129	October 3, 1947	Willie Cherry	26	25	1	Male	Black	North Carolina	Gas chamber	
130	October 5, 1947	Raymond Davis	17	17	1	Male	Black	Texas	Electrocution	
131	October 6, 1947	Jim Owen	43	43	0	Male	Black	Georgia	Electrocution	
132	October 6, 1947	William Paul Byron	39	38	1	Male	White	Pennsylvania	Electrocution	
133	October 6, 1947	Charles Frederick Moyer	25	24	1	Male	White	Pennsylvania	Electrocution	
134	October 10, 1947	Sweetie Bryant Jr.	29	28	1	Male	Black	Georgia	Electrocution	
135	October 10, 1947	Oscar L. Ford	21	20	1	Male	Black	Georgia	Electrocution	
136	October 10, 1947	Oscar Douglas	40	39	1	Male	Black	North Carolina	Gas chamber	
137	October 17, 1947	Buford Russell Morton	30	29	1	Male	Black	Virginia	Electrocution	
138	October 20, 1947	Michael Bubna	37	35	2	Male	White	Pennsylvania	Electrocution	
139	October 24, 1947	Ernest Gaither Jr.	23	23	0	Male	Black	Illinois	Electrocution	
140	October 24, 1947	Raymond Laurence	29	28	1	Male	Black	Virginia	Electrocution	
141	October 27, 1947	Lawrence Brown	21	20	1	Male	Black	Pennsylvania	Electrocution	
142	October 31, 1947	Alfred Lorenzo Hawkins	24	Unknown	Unknown	Male	Black	District of Columbia	Electrocution	
143	October 31, 1947	J. C. Brooks	29	28	1	Male	Black	North Carolina	Gas chamber	
144	October 31, 1947	Grady Brown	27	27	0	Male	Black	North Carolina	Gas chamber	
145	October 31, 1947	Thurman Jefferson Munn	25	25	0	Male	Black	North Carolina	Gas chamber	
146	October 31, 1947	Lester Stanley	28	27	1	Male	Black	North Carolina	Gas chamber	
147	November 14, 1947	Francis Paul Barnes	22	20	2	Male	White	California	Gas chamber	
148	November 14, 1947	Marvin Claude Bell	25	24	1	Male	White	North Carolina	Gas chamber	
149	November 14, 1947	Ralph Vernon Litteral	35	34	1	Male	White	North Carolina	Gas chamber	
150	November 14, 1947	William Little	43	Unknown	Unknown	Male	Black	North Carolina	Gas chamber	
151	November 18, 1947	Nick Morakis (or Morakes)	53	51	2	Male	White	Georgia	Electrocution	
152	November 28, 1947	Robert Britton	23	22	1	Male	Black	Ohio	Electrocution	
153	November 28, 1947	James Griffin Jr.	27	26	1	Male	Black	Ohio	Electrocution	
154	December 4, 1947	Enix Bussey	32	30	2	Male	Black	New York	Electrocution	
155	December 5, 1947	Frank Campbell	25	Unknown	Unknown	Male	Black	Mississippi	Electrocution	
156	December 8, 1947	William W. Chavis	22	21	1	Male	Black	Pennsylvania	Electrocution	
157	December 12, 1947	Roosevelt Miller	22	21	1	Male	Black	South Carolina	Electrocution	
158	December 18, 1947	Walter Lee Boyd	26	25	1	Male	Black	Mississippi	Electrocution	

== Demographics ==
Gender
Male	156	99%
Female	2	1%
Ethnicity
Black	116	73%
White	42	27%
State
North Carolina	23	15%
Georgia	16	10%
South Carolina	13	8%
New York	12	8%
Pennsylvania	11	7%
Texas	10	6%
Louisiana	8	5%
California	7	4%
Arkansas	6	4%
Florida	6	4%
Mississippi	6	4%
Ohio	5	3%
Virginia	5	3%
Maryland	4	3%
Missouri	3	2%
Tennessee	3	2%
Alabama	2	1%
Colorado	2	1%
Illinois	2	1%
Kansas	2	1%
Massachusetts	2	1%
District of Columbia	1	1%
Kentucky	1	1%
Nevada	1	1%
New Mexico	1	1%
Oklahoma	1	1%
South Dakota	1	1%
U.S. military	1	1%
Vermont	1	1%
Washington	1	1%
West Virginia	1	1%
Method
Electrocution	113	72%
Gas chamber	36	23%
Hanging	8	5%
Month
January	14	9%
February	7	4%
March	10	6%
April	21	13%
May	15	9%
June	19	12%
July	17	11%
August	17	11%
September	4	3%
October	22	14%
November	7	4%
December	5	3%
Age
Unknown	1	1%
10–19	11	7%
20–29	90	57%
30–39	35	22%
40–49	17	11%
50–59	2	1%
60–69	2	1%
Total	158	100%

== Executions in recent years ==
Number of executions
1948	117
1947	158
1946	129
Total	404

Preceded by 1946	List of people executed in the United States in 1947	Succeeded by 1948
