= Samuel Frost =

Samuel Frost may refer to:

- Samuel H. Frost (born 1818), New York state senator 1870–71
- Samuel Frost (pioneer)
- Samuel Frost (politician), New York state senator 1848–49
- Samuel Frost (murderer) (1765–1793), American murderer

== See also ==
- Sam Frost, Australian rules football player
