= Murder of Penowanyanquis =

1638 murder case in Plymouth Colony, Massachusetts

The murder of Penowanyanquis took place in Plymouth Colony (now modern-day Massachusetts) in July 1638. Penowanyanquis, a Native American man who was part of the Nipmuc, was attacked by four runaway indentured servants – Thomas Jackson, Richard Stinnings, Daniel Cross (or Crosse), and their informal leader Arthur Peach, the four sometimes being referred to as the "Peach Gang" – during a botched attempt at highway robbery. Penowanyanquis lived for several days after the attack, long enough to identify his attackers. After the four were arrested, Cross fled before he could be taken to trial and was never located, but Stinnings, Jackson, and Peach were all taken into custody, convicted of murder and robbery, and judicially executed in September 1638.

Jackson, Peach, and Stinnings were the only people of European descent to have been executed for murdering a Native American person in the history of Plymouth Colony. Historian Tobey Pearl called Penowanyanquis "one of the most significant crime victims in colonial history" and noted that the ensuing murder trial was the first "trial by jury" for a charge as serious as murder.

== Background ==
Historian Tobey Pearl described Penowanyanquis as a Nipmuc man who was "young," but old enough to have a family of his own. He was able to communicate with colonists in English. Penowanyanquis was known as either a messenger or a "man-servant." He was not considered an elder or a high-ranking member within his community.

Arthur Peach was 18 to 20 years old and of Irish descent, although he lived in London until 1635, when he arrived aboard the ship Plaine Joan in Virginia. Peach later moved to Plymouth Colony. He was also a veteran of the Pequot War.

After the war, Peach was held in indentured servitude under Edward Winslow, the governor of Plymouth Colony. Massachusetts Bay Colony Governor John Winthrop described Arthur Peach as "a young man of good parentage and fair condition." During his tenure as an indentured servant, Peach had a sexual affair with Dorothy Temple, an indentured servant belonging to Stephen Hopkins; Peach impregnated Temple out of wedlock.

Either Thomas Jackson or Daniel Cross was indentured to John Barnes, a man of stature from Plymouth Colony. Richard Stinnings signed a contract to be an indentured servant to a man named Robert Bartlett for nine years, after which Bartlett would provide Stinnings with money and two clothing outfits.

At some point, Peach fled alongside fellow indentured servants Jackson, Stinnings, and Cross. While it was unclear why the other three men joined Peach and abandoned their servitude, Peach himself had several motives, one being the fact that he had impregnated Temple, as the act of premarital sex would have carried a punishment on its own, as well as a likely marriage to Temple, which Peach did not want. Prior, Stephen Hopkins and his wife, Elizabeth, had forbidden Peach from seeing Temple and being on their property, as they suspected the two were having a sexual affair. Additionally, Peach did not like the manual labor required of him as an indentured servant, and he accrued mounting debts due to reckless spending habits. Due to having fled their positions of servitude, the four were all considered fugitives, as they were in violation of their contracts. Indentured servants who ran away from their work were frequently subjected to severe discipline, including whipping, if they were relocated. These punishments were typically determined following trials. Peach, Jackson, Stinnings, and Cross intended to escape New England so they could avoid punishment.

=== Relationship between Native Americans and Europeans ===
Relations between Native American groups and English settlers in the early 17th century were tense. There were several incidents of English settlers whipping Native American people who they accused of stealing or disrespect.

In the early 17th century, there was a large expanse of forested wilderness between Plymouth Colony and Providence in Rhode Island. Native American people created paths and trails through this wilderness that they used for travel and trade.

The four servants, with Peach acting as the ringleader, used these paths and trails to travel westward towards New Netherland along the Hudson River. They chose this location due to the lack of Puritan authority. One reason why the four may have been discomfited by the presence of a Native American man on the trail they were using was that some Native American people were known to report and return missing indentured servants to their masters.

== Murder ==
In July 1638, Mixanno, a chief of the Narragansett people located in modern-day southern Rhode Island, prepared a gift to send to English colonists in Plymouth Colony as a gesture and symbol of friendship. Mixanno selected Penowanyanquis, a member of a different Algonquin group (the Nipmuc), to deliver the gift. Penowanyanquis used the Native American-created trails between Plymouth and Providence to make the trip.

During the trip to Plymouth, Penowanyanquis passed by Peach, Jackson, Stinnings, and Cross, who, by this point, were hungry and lost in the wilderness on one of the paths between Providence and Plymouth. The four men decided to set a trap for Penowanyanquis, intending to rob him during his return trip. During his return trip back to Rhode Island, Penowanyanquis again encountered the four men, who invited him to spend time around their campfire. When Penowanyanquis agreed, the four stole "five vathoms of wampeny, and three coats of woolen cloth". Peach then stabbed Penowanyanquis in the leg and stomach using a rapier. Trial testimony also indicated that another one of the men, who was unspecified, attempted to aid Peach in attacking Penowanyanquis. Although critically injured, Penowanyanquis was able to flee his attackers and seek refuge in a marsh.

=== Discovery and apprehension ===
Penowanyanquis remained hidden in the marsh for several hours before making his way back to the path, staying in an area where he believed other travelers would find him. A group of Narragansett men soon found Penowanyanquis gravely injured along the path and rescued him. Meanwhile, while continuing toward Providence, Peach and his accomplices encountered a cottage inhabited by William Blackstone. Blackstone advised them to continue toward Providence and seek help from Roger Williams. However, the four remained in Blackstone's area until the Narragansett men who discovered Penowanyanquis approached Blackstone for questioning about the attack, prompting them to flee to find Williams before the Narragansett men could find Williams.

Although Peach and his associates found Williams first, they did not inform Williams of the attack on Penowanyanquis; Williams fed and clothed them as they appeared hungry, lost, and scared, and he assigned them two Native American guides to help them on their way to New Netherland. The Narragansett men who had questioned Blackstone informed Williams of the attack later that day, prompting Williams and two colonial physicians to find Penowanyanquis and administer medical aid to attempt to save his life. They carried him back to their settlement in Providence, where Penowanyanquis informed Williams that his attackers were white indentured servants shortly before dying due to blood loss and infection. Williams, recognizing that the attackers were the same men who had approached him for help earlier that day, aided in efforts by the Narragansett to apprehend them in Aquidneck Island. Williams owned a young enslaved male Native American, whom he named Will, who also played a significant role in apprehending and identifying Peach and his cohorts.

Despite helping to place the men into custody, on August 14, 1638, Roger Williams wrote a letter to John Winthrop, the governor of the Massachusetts Bay Colony, to plead for the lives of the accused to be spared. Williams specifically defended Peach, stating that although Peach was the leader of the group in that he inflicted the fatal wound in the crime, Peach should still have his life spared because he was "Mr. Winslow's man" (referring to his status as Edward Winslow's indentured servant).

Before the trial, Daniel Cross escaped custody, stealing a canoe from a local Native American group and using it to cross the bay from Aquidneck Island.

== Trial, execution, and aftermath ==
There was a brief debate as to where the trial would take place, between Aquidneck Island, Massachusetts Bay Colony, Providence, and Plymouth Colony. Due to its relatively developed legal system and its capabilities to handle any potential fallout in the event of colonial authorities mishandling the case, colonial authorities ultimately decided to host the trial in Plymouth Colony.

The trial took place on September 4, 1638, in Plymouth's meeting house. The twelve jurors sworn to hear the case were William Hatch, John Winslow, William Pontus, Edward Foster, Richard Derby, John Holmes, John Peabody, Richard Sillis, Humfrey Turner, Samuel Hinckley, Giles Rickett, and Gabriel Fallowell. All the jurors who heard the murder case were white men; none had Indigenous American lineage or belonged to any specific Indigenous communities, tribes, or groups. Several Narragansett and Wampanoag people attended the trial, adorned in traditional garb. Roger Williams attended the trial as well. Due to Cross's escape, only Arthur Peach, Thomas Jackson, and Richard Stinnings were tried for Penowanyanquis's robbery and murder. The trial was presided over by Thomas Prence, the governor of Plymouth Colony at the time.

According to William Bradford's Of Plymouth Plantation, those who took issue with the notion of a European settler being executed for the murder of a Native American person were considered to be of "the rude and ignorant sorte." Alternatively, Bradford also feared that the acquittal of the accused would result in retaliation from Native American people, and that an acquittal or mismanagement of the trial had the potential to cause war. After a one-day trial, Peach, Jackson, and Stinnings were convicted of murder and robbery and sentenced to death. The death sentences were summarily carried out later on September 4, as it was typical at the time for people condemned to death in the 17th century to be ushered to their executions immediately following their guilty verdicts at trial. The three were escorted to the gallows by tumbrel and hanged by Plymouth Colony constable Joshua Pratt. Witnesses reported that Peach and one other of his compatriots displayed penitence and solemnity during the execution, while the third man executed, who remained unnamed in contemporaneous accounts of the execution, was apparently not penitent or solemn.

=== Aftermath ===
Temple gave birth to the child she had with Peach sometime after his execution. Due to having birthed Peach's illegitimate child, Temple was sentenced to be whipped twice in June 1639. Temple was only ever whipped once, on June 4, because she fainted during the first whipping, so authorities decided not to subject her to the second whipping. Separately, the Plymouth Court ruled that Stephen Hopkins was financially responsible for Temple and the child she conceived with Peach for the two remaining years she had to serve in indentured servitude. Hopkins evicted the two from his house, resulting in his temporary imprisonment due to his actions being in contempt of court. John Holmes, who had served on the jury that condemned Peach to death, purchased Dorothy for the remaining two years on her contract and agreed to support her and the child.

Daniel Cross was never located or subjected to a trial. Winthrop posited that he ran away to hide among the Piscataway people (whom Winthrop referred to as "those of Piscat") located in modern-day Portsmouth, New Hampshire, and Winthrop sent men to look for Cross, but the Piscataway people helped Cross to elude detection.

Retrospective interpretations differ regarding the harsh punishment the convicted men received. Some historians view the executions as the Plymouth Colony's attempt to assert their intention to treat the lives and murders of Native American people fairly and equally to those of white Puritans. Meanwhile, others posit that the executions underscored the tensions between Native Americans and Puritans, the latter of whom instituted a harsh punishment for the three men in an attempt to maintain good relations with Native American people and prevent potential conflict. Some historians posited that the executions of Jackson, Peach, and Stinnings likely prevented a potential war that could have arisen from the tensions between Native Americans and Puritans.

== See also ==
- Capital punishment in Massachusetts
- List of people executed in Massachusetts
- Race and capital punishment in the United States
