= List of people executed in the United States in 1946 =

One hundred and twenty-nine people, one hundred and twenty-eight male and one female, were executed in the United States in 1946, ninety-five by electrocution, twenty-three by gas chamber, and eleven by hanging.

== List of people executed in the United States in 1946 ==
No.	Date of execution	Name	Age of person			Gender	Ethnicity	State	Method	Ref.
No.	Date of execution	Name	At execution	At offense	Age difference	Gender	Ethnicity	State	Method	Ref.
1	January 4, 1946	James Waybern Hall	24	23	1	Male	White	Arkansas	Electrocution	
2	January 7, 1946	Shellie McKeithen	52	50	2	Male	Black	Pennsylvania	Electrocution	
3	January 11, 1946	Andrew Holloman	31	Unknown	Unknown	Male	Black	Virginia	Electrocution	
4	January 14, 1946	Charlie Holloway	30	29	1	Male	Black	Florida	Electrocution	
5	January 14, 1946	James Reed	28	27	1	Male	Black	Florida	Electrocution	
6	January 14, 1946	George Lafayette Sullivan	37	34	3	Male	White	Florida	Electrocution	
7	January 17, 1946	Oliver Little	22	21	1	Male	Black	New York	Electrocution	
8	January 18, 1946	Peter Paul Hall	23	Unknown	Unknown	Male	Black	Alabama	Electrocution	
9	January 18, 1946	William Tasker	21	Unknown	Unknown	Male	Black	Maryland	Hanging	
10	January 18, 1946	Jarvin Raymond Elliott	23	Unknown	Unknown	Male	Black	Texas	Electrocution	
11	January 18, 1946	Joseph Bernard Wessel	44	43	1	Male	White	Washington	Hanging	
12	January 25, 1946	Ernest Johnson	17	16	1	Male	Black	Alabama	Electrocution	
13	January 25, 1946	Wash Pringle	32	Unknown	Unknown	Male	Black	South Carolina	Electrocution	
14	February 1, 1946	Richard Brown	19	18	1	Male	Black	Alabama	Electrocution	
15	February 2, 1946	Andrew W. Dennis	45	43	2	Male	White	Oregon	Gas chamber	
16	February 5, 1946	Woodrow Wilson Clark	29	27	2	Male	White	Washington	Hanging	
17	February 8, 1946	Eddie Daniels	34	31	3	Male	Black	Georgia	Electrocution	
18	February 9, 1946	Ralph Dayton Brown	33	32	1	Male	White	Ohio	Electrocution	
19	February 9, 1946	Frank J. Naiberg	46	38	8	Male	White	Ohio	Electrocution	
20	February 15, 1946	Walter Lorenzo Hightower	39	38	1	Male	Black	North Carolina	Gas chamber	
21	February 15, 1946	Ernest Edward Fagan	31	31	0	Male	Black	Virginia	Electrocution	
22	March 1, 1946	Johnnie Outlaw	27	26	1	Male	Black	Tennessee	Electrocution	
23	March 1, 1946	Thomas Walker	33	32	1	Male	Black	Tennessee	Electrocution	
24	March 7, 1946	George W. Donaldson	48	46	2	Male	White	New York	Electrocution	
25	March 15, 1946	Elbert Jeremiah Burns	65	62	3	Male	White	Alabama	Electrocution	
26	March 15, 1946	Anderson Adkins	34	33	1	Male	White	Kentucky	Electrocution	
27	March 15, 1946	Roosevelt Morgan	37	37	0	Male	Black	Mississippi	Electrocution	
28	March 22, 1946	Arthur Jones	17	15	2	Male	Black	Kentucky	Electrocution	
29	March 22, 1946	Thomas Earl Warner	20	18	2	Male	Black	Kentucky	Electrocution	
30	March 24, 1946	Edward Charles Calhoun	22	21	1	Male	White	Kentucky	Electrocution	
31	March 25, 1946	Robert William Pepperman	29	29	0	Male	White	Pennsylvania	Electrocution	
32	March 25, 1946	John Darius West	27	27	0	Male	White	Pennsylvania	Electrocution	
33	March 29, 1946	Isaac Bonner	19	19	0	Male	Black	Georgia	Electrocution	
34	March 29, 1946	Leon Lewis	26	25	1	Male	Black	Georgia	Electrocution	
35	March 29, 1946	Phillip Henry Heincy	73	72	1	Male	White	Iowa	Hanging	
36	March 29, 1946	William Henry Heincy	45	43	2	Male	White	Iowa	Hanging	
37	April 2, 1946	Frank James Quarles	45	44	1	Male	Black	Indiana	Electrocution	
38	April 4, 1946	Charlie Holloway	Unknown	Unknown	Unknown	Male	Black	Mississippi	Electrocution	
39	April 12, 1946	Willie Riley	Unknown	Unknown	Unknown	Male	Black	Arkansas	Electrocution	
40	April 12, 1946	Robert Lee Ming	26	25	1	Male	White	California	Gas chamber	
41	April 15, 1946	Nelson Cross	32	Unknown	Unknown	Male	Black	Virginia	Electrocution	
42	April 19, 1946	Robert Stephen Pilley	26	24	2	Male	White	Alabama	Electrocution	
43	April 19, 1946	Willie Jones	30	30	0	Male	Black	Georgia	Electrocution	
44	April 22, 1946	Eddie Lewis	52	51	1	Male	Black	Florida	Electrocution	
45	April 25, 1946	Abraham Gold	45	44	1	Male	White	New York	Electrocution	
46	April 26, 1946	Sam Williams	38	36	2	Male	Black	California	Gas chamber	
47	April 26, 1946	Alligood King	32	31	1	Male	Black	North Carolina	Gas chamber	
48	May 4, 1946	Thomas B. Hart	Unknown	Unknown	Unknown	Male	Black	North Carolina	Gas chamber	
49	May 8, 1946	Clyde Moore	21	Unknown	Unknown	Male	Black	Texas	Electrocution	
50	May 9, 1946	Willie Carter	24	22	2	Male	Black	Mississippi	Electrocution	
51	May 10, 1946	Forrest Sturdivant	34	Unknown	Unknown	Male	Black	Delaware	Hanging	
52	May 10, 1946	Pedro Talamante	54	52	2	Male	Hispanic	New Mexico	Electrocution	
53	May 20, 1946	Thomas Edward Harrison	19	19	0	Male	White	Virginia	Electrocution	
54	May 24, 1946	Lester Wingard	Unknown	Unknown	Unknown	Male	Black	Alabama	Electrocution	
55	May 24, 1946	Fred Hicks	33	31	2	Male	Black	Alabama	Electrocution	
56	May 24, 1946	George Edwards Jr.	18	17	1	Male	Black	Louisiana	Electrocution	
57	May 24, 1946	Gurney Herring	26	25	1	Male	Black	North Carolina	Gas chamber	
58	May 31, 1946	Early Bryant	30	Unknown	Unknown	Male	Black	Georgia	Electrocution	
59	May 31, 1946	Alfred Clarence Bingham	40	37	3	Male	White	Oklahoma	Electrocution	
60	June 14, 1946	Lodies Joe Mincey	30	29	1	Male	Black	Alabama	Electrocution	
61	June 21, 1946	James Leo Williams	25	24	1	Male	Black	Mississippi	Electrocution	
62	June 21, 1946	George Walker	23	22	1	Male	Black	North Carolina	Gas chamber	
63	June 21, 1946	George Grissett	33	32	1	Male	Black	Virginia	Electrocution	
64	June 21, 1946	James Hough	29	28	1	Male	Black	Virginia	Electrocution	
65	June 21, 1946	Arthur Johnson	22	21	1	Male	Black	Virginia	Electrocution	
66	June 28, 1946	William Ayers	32	Unknown	Unknown	Male	Black	Louisiana	Electrocution	
67	June 28, 1946	Fred I. Deaton	39	38	1	Male	White	North Carolina	Gas chamber	
68	June 28, 1946	Fab Stewart	45	44	1	Male	Black	North Carolina	Gas chamber	
69	June 28, 1946	Richard Gamble	32	31	1	Male	Black	Texas	Electrocution	
70	July 5, 1946	Anderson Burke	28	Unknown	Unknown	Male	Black	Georgia	Electrocution	
71	July 5, 1946	George Douglass	20	18	2	Male	Black	Tennessee	Electrocution	
72	July 12, 1946	Junius A. Judge	25	24	1	Male	Black	South Carolina	Electrocution	
73	July 19, 1946	Earl McFarland	25	23	2	Male	White	District of Columbia	Electrocution	
74	July 19, 1946	Aaron Napper	41	40	1	Male	Black	Georgia	Electrocution	
75	July 19, 1946	Sherman Street	31	Unknown	Unknown	Male	Black	Mississippi	Electrocution	
76	July 19, 1946	Louis C. Gatlin	21	19	2	Male	Black	South Carolina	Electrocution	
77	July 19, 1946	L. C. Newman	26	Unknown	Unknown	Male	Black	Texas	Electrocution	
78	August 2, 1946	Jesse R. McKethan	22	21	1	Male	White	Georgia	Electrocution	
79	August 9, 1946	Lloyd Walker	22	21	1	Male	Black	Maryland	Hanging	
80	August 16, 1946	William Edgar Alston	41	40	1	Male	White	Alabama	Electrocution	
81	August 16, 1946	Raphael Skopp	33	31	2	Male	White	Massachusetts	Electrocution	
82	August 16, 1946	Fred Ellis	23	20	3	Male	Black	Missouri	Gas chamber	
83	August 16, 1946	Jesse Sanford	37	34	3	Male	Black	Missouri	Gas chamber	
84	August 23, 1946	Albert Everette Sala	38	37	1	Male	White	Nevada	Gas chamber	
85	August 30, 1946	Alvin Hicks	24	21	3	Male	White	Tennessee	Electrocution	
86	August 30, 1946	John H. Luffman	46	43	3	Male	White	Tennessee	Electrocution	
87	September 1, 1946	Joe G. Leza	30	30	0	Male	Hispanic	Texas	Electrocution	
88	September 1, 1946	Harold Lee Palm	34	34	0	Male	Black	Texas	Electrocution	
89	September 12, 1946	Louis Dwight Brookins	22	20	2	Male	White	New York	Electrocution	
90	September 13, 1946	Kenneth William Bailey	27	26	1	Male	White	Oregon	Gas chamber	
91	September 13, 1946	James Lee Fletcher Jr.	21	21	0	Male	Black	Virginia	Electrocution	
92	September 13, 1946	Robert S. Holland	21	21	0	Male	Black	Virginia	Electrocution	
93	September 20, 1946	Otto Stephen Wilson	35	33	2	Male	White	California	Gas chamber	
94	September 27, 1946	Charlie Bernard	41	40	1	Male	Black	California	Gas chamber	
95	September 30, 1946	Jacob Sugg Webb	26	26	0	Male	Black	Florida	Electrocution	
96	October 1, 1946	Raymond Lewie	19	17	2	Male	White	Connecticut	Electrocution	
97	October 1, 1946	James J. McCarthy	21	20	1	Male	White	Connecticut	Electrocution	
98	October 1, 1946	Arthur Tommaselli	25	24	1	Male	White	Connecticut	Electrocution	
99	October 4, 1946	William Daniel Demby	23	22	1	Male	Black	Maryland	Hanging	
100	October 4, 1946	Roy N. Peters	22	21	1	Male	Black	Maryland	Hanging	
101	October 11, 1946	Richard Lee Collins	22	22	0	Male	White	West Virginia	Hanging	
102	October 14, 1946	Corrine Sykes	22	20	2	Female	Black	Pennsylvania	Electrocution	
103	October 22, 1946	Walter Hillman Yearwood	23	22	1	Male	White	Georgia	Electrocution	
104	October 25, 1946	Wilson Melvin De La Roi	28	24	4	Male	White	California	Gas chamber	
105	October 28, 1946	Frederick Morris	25	24	1	Male	White	Pennsylvania	Electrocution	
106	November 1, 1946	Robert Lee Nash	43	42	1	Male	White	North Carolina	Gas chamber	
107	November 1, 1946	Mose Paul Johnson	34	31	3	Male	Native American	Oklahoma	Electrocution	
108	November 8, 1946	Alton Murray	29	28	1	Male	White	Georgia	Electrocution	
109	November 15, 1946	Lee James Allen	16	15	1	Male	Black	Georgia	Electrocution	
110	November 22, 1946	Elton Chitwood	25	24	1	Male	White	Arkansas	Electrocution	
111	November 22, 1946	Johnnie Burns	22	21	1	Male	Black	Georgia	Electrocution	
112	November 22, 1946	Willie Stevenson	17	16	1	Male	Black	Georgia	Electrocution	
113	November 22, 1946	Wilbert Johnson	24	22	2	Male	Black	North Carolina	Gas chamber	
114	November 22, 1946	Charles Primus Jr.	26	24	2	Male	Black	North Carolina	Gas chamber	
115	November 29, 1946	Andrew Thomas	23	22	1	Male	Black	Arkansas	Electrocution	
116	November 29, 1946	William Crain	40	38	2	Male	White	California	Gas chamber	
117	November 29, 1946	James Rufus Williams	22	21	1	Male	Black	Georgia	Electrocution	
118	November 29, 1946	Harry Huff	Unknown	Unknown	Unknown	Male	Black	Mississippi	Electrocution	
119	November 29, 1946	Charles T. Smith	66	Unknown	Unknown	Male	Black	South Carolina	Electrocution	
120	December 13, 1946	Johnnie B. Smith	24	Unknown	Unknown	Male	Black	Alabama	Electrocution	
121	December 13, 1946	Albert Parker	29	29	0	Male	Black	Georgia	Electrocution	
122	December 13, 1946	Jack Lester Barnes	25	24	1	Male	Black	Maryland	Hanging	
123	December 13, 1946	Herman Matthews	19	18	1	Male	Black	North Carolina	Gas chamber	
124	December 13, 1946	Calvin Coolidge Williams	18	17	1	Male	Black	North Carolina	Gas chamber	
125	December 20, 1946	William Copeland	38	36	2	Male	Black	District of Columbia	Electrocution	
126	December 20, 1946	Julius Fisher	32	30	2	Male	Black	District of Columbia	Electrocution	
127	December 20, 1946	Joseph Dunbar Medley	45	43	2	Male	White	District of Columbia	Electrocution	
128	December 20, 1946	J. C. Hill	19	18	1	Male	Black	Georgia	Electrocution	
129	December 20, 1946	Lewis Scott	26	25	1	Male	Black	South Carolina	Electrocution	

== Demographics ==
Gender
Male	128	99%
Female	1	1%
Ethnicity
Black	83	64%
White	43	33%
Hispanic	2	2%
Native American	1	1%
State
Georgia	16	12%
North Carolina	12	9%
Alabama	10	8%
Virginia	9	7%
California	6	5%
Mississippi	6	5%
Texas	6	5%
Florida	5	4%
Maryland	5	4%
Pennsylvania	5	4%
South Carolina	5	4%
Tennessee	5	4%
Arkansas	4	3%
District of Columbia	4	3%
Kentucky	4	3%
New York	4	3%
Connecticut	3	2%
Iowa	2	2%
Louisiana	2	2%
Missouri	2	2%
Ohio	2	2%
Oklahoma	2	2%
Oregon	2	2%
Washington	2	2%
Delaware	1	1%
Indiana	1	1%
Massachusetts	1	1%
Nevada	1	1%
New Mexico	1	1%
West Virginia	1	1%
Method
Electrocution	95	74%
Gas chamber	23	18%
Hanging	11	9%
Month
January	13	10%
February	8	6%
March	15	12%
April	11	9%
May	12	9%
June	10	8%
July	8	6%
August	9	7%
September	9	7%
October	10	8%
November	14	11%
December	10	8%
Age
Unknown	5	4%
10–19	13	10%
20–29	56	43%
30–39	33	26%
40–49	16	12%
50–59	3	2%
60–69	2	2%
70–79	1	1%
Total	129	100%

== Executions in recent years ==
Number of executions
1947	158
1946	129
1945	142
Total	429

Preceded by 1945	List of people executed in the United States in 1946	Succeeded by 1947
