= William Pontus =

English pilgrim and radical

William Pontus (1583–1652) was an English Pilgrim and a notable Separatist activist and radical. He was a prominent voice against the Church of England, and became an important settler of Plymouth Colony.

== Biography ==
William Pontus was born in 1583, in the town of Dover, England. He was born to strict separatist parents, and fled to Holland as a young man, to avoid religious persecution, where he worked as a fustian worker. Once in Leyden, William joined the Pilgrims, and he and other fellow Pilgrims published a newspaper called "The Pilgrim Press," which openly denounced and insulted the Church of England. Pontus knew full well that if he had published this scandalous material in England, he would've been hanged for heresy.

On 4 December 1610, William married Wybra Hanson, a relative of future Plymouth Colony leader William Bradford. She was as radical as Pontus was: coming from a prominent family of separatists, she was arrested multiple times for her religious views, which made her hatred of the Church of England grow even stronger. At the age of 17, she escaped England, coming to live with her relative, William Bradford.

When the Mayflower departed Holland in July 1620, the Pontus family did not accompany their fellow Pilgrims, but stayed behind in Leyden. In fact, The family did not leave Holland until 1630. When they arrived in Plymouth, William Pontus was in a financially bad shape. He was too poor to be taxed upon his arrival, probably due to the amount of money he had spent on travelling to The New World. However, he built up his fortune over the years, and became one of Plymouth's most influential colonists. He received multiple land grants from the governor of the colony, William Bradford, for repairing the Herring Weir for the town.

On 4 September 1638, Pontus served on the jury that convicted Arthur Peach, Thomas Jackson, and Richard Stinnings of the highway robbery and murder of Penowanyanquis. The trial was considered the first "trial by jury" to take place in American history for a crime as serious as murder, and the executions of Peach, Jackson, and Stinnings were the only occasions in Plymouth Colony history wherein white settlers were put to death for the murder of a Native American.

William Pontus died in Plymouth on 9 February 1652.

== Children ==
William Pontus and Wybra Hanson had two children:

- Mary Pontus: Born around 1612. She married John Glass in 1645, and had one child: Hannah Glass. She later remarried to Phillipe Delano, and had a son, Samuel.
- Hannah Pontus: Born in 1614. She married John Churchill in 1644. She had six children.

== Bibliography ==
- http://www.marthachurchill.com/family/chJohnChildren.htm
- https://massandmoregenealogy.blogspot.com/2012/01/william-pontus-abt-1583-to-1652-england.html
