= Louise Peete =

American serial killer

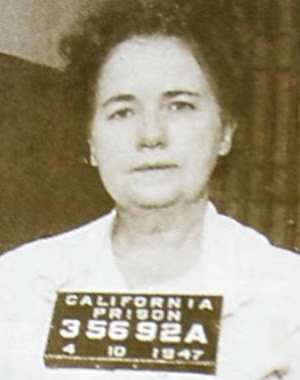
- Mugshot day prior to execution
- Born: Lofie Louise Preslar; September 20, 1880; Bienville, Louisiana, U.S.
- Died: April 11, 1947 (aged 66); San Quentin State Prison, California, U.S.
- Resting place: Angelus-Rosedale Cemetery
- Other names: Louise M. Gould; Anna Lee
- Spouses: Henry Bosley (m. 1903; died 1906) Harry Faurote (m. 1913; died 1913) Richard Peete (m. 1915; div. 1923) Lee Borden Judson (m. 1944; died 1945)
- Children: 1
- Status: Executed by gas chamber
- Motive: Financial gain
- Conviction: First degree murder (2 counts)
- Penalty: Life imprisonment (Denton murder); Death (Logan murder)

Details
- Victims: 3+ (including one which was ruled self-defense)
- Date: 1913 (Joe Appel); June 2, 1920 (Denton murder); June 1, 1944 (Logan murder)
- Country: United States
- States: California and Texas
- Weapon: .32 S&W
- Date apprehended: December 20, 1944 (Logan murder)
- Imprisoned at: San Quentin State Prison

Louise Peete (September 20, 1880 – April 11, 1947) was a convicted American serial killer. Peete was first convicted of the 1920 murder of wealthy mining engineer Jacob C. Denton, and was sentenced to life in prison in 1921. She was paroled in April 1939. In May 1945, Peete was convicted a second time for murdering her employer, Margaret Logan, and was sentenced to death. She was executed in April 1947, making her the second of only four women to be executed in the California gas chamber.

== Early life ==
Peete was born Lofie Louise Preslar in Bienville, Louisiana. Her father was a prominent and wealthy newspaper publisher. Peete would later say that she "came from cultured, educated people. My parents were not delinquents, and did not rear delinquent children." She attended a private school in New Orleans, but was expelled at the age of 15 for stealing from her classmates and engaging in promiscuous behavior.

In 1903, she married a traveling salesman, Henry Bosley, who committed suicide four years later after discovering Peete in bed with another man. After Bosley's death, Peete relocated to Shreveport and worked as a high-class prostitute, stealing money from her clients.

In 1911, Peete made her way to Boston, Massachusetts and changed her name to "Louise M. Gould". She then began claiming that she was a 19-year-old Dallas heiress named R. H. Rosley. As Rosley, Peete claimed that she had been confined to a convent by her family and had run away. She ingratiated herself into several wealthy Boston families with her beauty and charm, and managed to convince one family to take her in. Peete then proceeded to charge items to the family at some of Boston's most expensive stores, and stole money from their friends and employees. After Peete's true identity was discovered, police allowed her to leave town to avoid embarrassing the family.

== Murders ==
Peete later moved to Waco, Texas, where she became romantically involved with wealthy oil baron Joe Appel. One week after the two met, Appel was found shot to death and his diamond jewelry missing. Peete was arrested for his murder, but convinced a grand jury that she had killed Appel in self-defense after he tried to rape her.

In 1913, Peete moved to Dallas, Texas and quickly married Harry Faurote, a night clerk who worked at the St. George Hotel. Shortly after the two married, Peete stole $20,000 worth of jewels from the hotel's safe. Police questioned Faurote but cleared him of any involvement. Police suspected Peete of the theft and questioned her, but had no evidence linking her to the crime. Embarrassed over being accused of theft and despondent over his wife's infidelities, Faurote shot himself. However this seems unlikely and he is more likely to have been another of Peete's victims.

By 1915, Peete had relocated to Denver, Colorado, where she married salesman Richard Peete. They had a daughter, Frances Ann (known as Betty), in 1916. The couple fought constantly and finally separated in the summer of 1920. Shortly thereafter, Peete left her estranged husband and daughter and moved to Los Angeles, California. It was there that she met Jacob C. Denton, a recent widower with a teenage daughter who had made millions as a mining engineer before retiring.

Denton met Peete when she inquired about renting his 14-room Tudor Revival mansion, located at 675 South Catalina Street near Wilshire Boulevard. Denton hoped to rent his home out for $350 a month while he went on a business trip in June. For unknown reasons, he agreed to allow Peete to rent the mansion for $75 a month. She moved in on May 26, a few days before Denton's planned departure. The true nature of Peete and Denton's relationship is unclear; she has been identified as Denton's live-in girlfriend, housekeeper and tenant despite the fact that she never signed a lease. Peete would later claim the two were romantically involved.

On June 2, 1920, a little over a week after Peete moved into the mansion, Denton disappeared. Shortly thereafter, Peete hired a gardener to transport a load of dirt into the basement claiming she was planning to grow mushrooms. On June 5, Peete forged Denton's signature to withdraw $300 from his bank account and to gain access to his safe deposit box. When a bank official noticed Denton's signature looked unusual, Peete claimed that his right arm had been amputated after he was shot by an angry "mysterious Spanish looking woman" with whom he had gotten into an argument.

Peete claimed that the signature looked unusual because she had to help Denton write checks and sign his name with his left hand. She later expounded on this story (and told several different versions including one where the mysterious woman cut Denton's arm and leg off with a sword), claiming that Denton was in seclusion as he was "ashamed" by his amputated arm and would only see and speak to her.

In the weeks that followed, Denton's friends, business associates and neighbors began asking Peete to reveal his whereabouts. Peete gave several stories to explain his absence, including a story that Denton was on an extended business trip in various locations and would return shortly. Meanwhile, Peete began posing as Denton's wife. She spent his money, began driving his Cadillac, pawned his jewelry and possessions, and rented rooms in his mansion and pocketed the rent money.

Peete also convinced tenants of Denton's rental properties in Phoenix, Arizona, to make their rent checks out to her. In August, she charged two expensive dresses at Bullock's department store in Denton's name, still claiming to be his wife. Around this time, Denton's teenaged daughter hired an attorney in an effort to find her father. The attorney questioned Peete, who claimed she did not know where Denton was, but agreed to forward his financial and business documents as soon as possible. The following month, Peete rented the mansion out and returned to her estranged husband and daughter in Denver.

With Peete out of the house, Denton's daughter was finally able to have the premises searched. On September 23, a private detective hired by the attorney searched the home and found Denton's decomposing body buried in the basement, in a wooden cubicle under the stairs. An autopsy determined that he had been shot in the head and strangled. His body was bound in numerous cords and wrapped in a quilt.

Police tracked Peete down in Denver and questioned her about Denton's murder. She maintained that she was not involved, but offered different scenarios to explain his death. Peete claimed that the unidentified "mysterious Spanish woman" who has purportedly shot Denton causing his arm to be amputated was his killer. This theory was quickly dismissed, as Denton's body was found with his right arm still attached, despite Peete's claim that Denton was in hiding because he was embarrassed about his missing arm. Peete then claimed that the body was not Denton, but that of a double whom Denton had killed. Peete was brought back to Los Angeles and was indicted on one charge of first-degree murder. Her trial began on January 21, 1921.

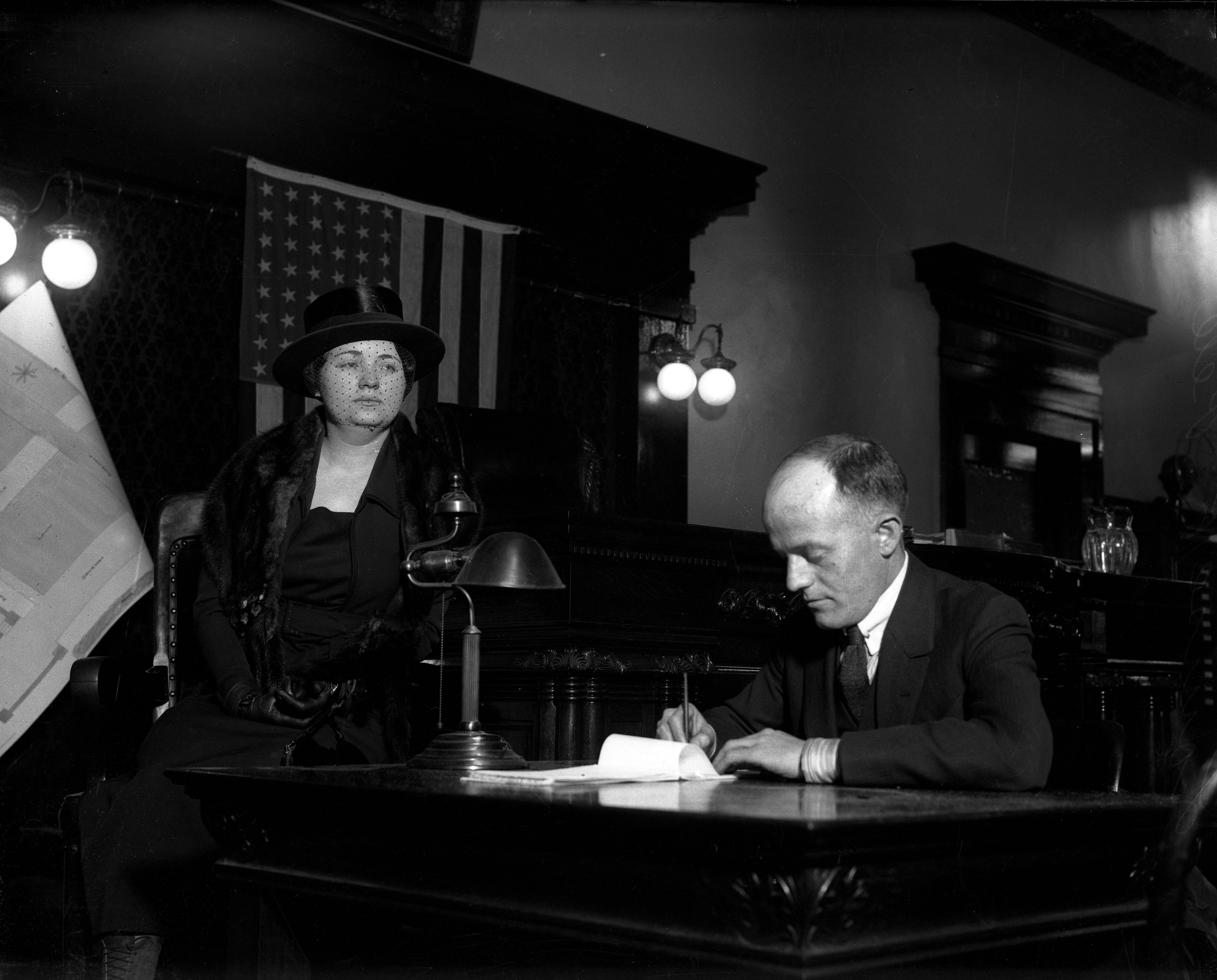
Peete at her first murder trial in Los Angeles

Peete's trial was extensively followed by newspapers nationwide. Coverage by the Hearst newspapers, known for their sensationalized reports and yellow journalism, was especially intense. Thousands of spectators lined up daily to watch Peete walk into the Hall of Justice. On February 17, 1921, she was convicted and sentenced to life imprisonment.

Throughout her trial and during the first two years of her sentence, Peete's husband Richard remained steadfastly loyal and continued to believe she was innocent. In 1923, she told Richard that he should divorce her so he would be free to remarry. Richard obliged, but vowed that he would "wait forever" for her release. Soon after the divorce was finalized, Peete stopped answering his letters and refused to see him. Despondent over her rejection, Richard shot himself in an Arizona hotel room in 1924. Peete later said her ex-husband killed himself because he felt guilty over her conviction and was despondent over his own poor health.

== Post prison years and third murder ==
Peete was initially imprisoned at San Quentin State Prison before being transferred to the California Institution for Women in Tehachapi. She was considered a model prisoner, working as a dental assistant, maintaining the prison's flower garden, and writing for the prison newspaper. After serving eighteen years, Peete was paroled for good behavior in 1939. She was released into the custody of Jessie Marcy, a woman who had lobbied for her release, and began working as her live-in housekeeper.

Marcy died of natural causes shortly thereafter. Peete then moved in with her probation officer, Emily Latham, and acted as her nurse and housekeeper. Latham died of a heart attack in 1943. Neither death was investigated at length as police were unaware that Peete was the subject of a previously publicized murder case or was on parole. Shortly after her release, Peete had legally changed her name to "Anna Lee".

After Latham's death, Peete moved in with Arthur C. Logan and his wife Margaret, an elderly couple who lived in Pacific Palisades. Peete had struck up a friendship with Margaret, a retired social worker, while she was in prison. Margaret believed that Peete was innocent and had also lobbied for her release. The Logans had also cared for Peete's daughter while she was in prison. Peete worked for the couple as a live-in housekeeper and nurse to Arthur, who was suffering from age-related dementia and had been declared mentally incompetent. Around this time, on May 2, 1944, Peete married banker Lee Borden Judson. Peete did not disclose to Judson that she had been previously imprisoned for murder.

Soon after Peete began working for the Logans, she began telling neighbors that Arthur had fits of rage and physically attacked her and Margaret on several occasions. On June 1, 1944, Margaret disappeared. Three days later, Arthur was committed to Patton State Hospital by Peete, who claimed to be his foster sister. When neighbors began asking about Margaret's whereabouts, Peete claimed that Arthur had attacked his wife in a frenzy and bitten her nose so severely that she was left disfigured.

When Peete's husband began asking about Margaret's whereabouts, Peete reiterated that Arthur had attacked his wife and added that Margaret had gone into seclusion to undergo plastic surgery. For the next six months, Peete and her husband continued to live in the Logans' home. As she had with Denton, Peete began spending the Logans' money and forging their names on checks. On December 6, 1944, Arthur died while still committed to Patton State Hospital. Peete donated his body to science.

Shortly after Arthur's death, employees at the Logans' bank detected one of the forgeries Peete made and called police. While investigating the forgery, police searched the Logan home where Peete and her husband were still living. On December 20, 1944, six months after Margaret disappeared, police discovered her decomposing body buried in a shallow grave under an avocado tree in the backyard. Peete was arrested and charged with murder a few hours after the discovery.

During questioning, Peete claimed that Margaret was bludgeoned and shot by her husband during a "homicidal frenzy". Peete admitted that she buried Margaret but denied killing her. She said she did not report the murder because she feared she would be blamed due to her previous conviction. An autopsy determined that Margaret had been shot in the back of the neck and had sustained a skull fracture.

Judson was also arrested and charged with murder. The couple both maintained their innocence. On January 11, 1945, the murder charge against Judson was dropped due to insufficient evidence and he was released. The following day, he jumped to his death from the ninth floor of the Spring Arcade, an office building in Los Angeles. Upon learning of her husband's death, Peete wept and told reporters, "I'm to blame for that. [...] He couldn't face disgrace. As long as I was associated with him, he was a marked man."

== Second conviction and execution ==
Peete's third murder trial began in Los Angeles on April 23, 1945. Prosecutors theorized that Peete killed Margaret Logan to gain control of her finances. They alleged that she killed Logan after the two had an argument about a $200 check Peete forged in Logan's name. On May 31, a jury found Louise Peete guilty of first-degree murder and sentenced her to death. While her sentence was being read, Peete sat in the courtroom reading The Importance of Living, a Chinese philosophy book by Lin Yutang. She looked up briefly to make a mocking facial expression to the prosecutor and then resumed reading.

In the years following her conviction, Peete continued to maintain her innocence. After several failed appeals, Peete was executed in the gas chamber at San Quentin State Prison on April 11, 1947. She was the second woman in California history to be executed by the state. Louise Peete is interred at Angelus-Rosedale Cemetery in Los Angeles.

== In popular culture ==
Her story was dramatized in the series Deadly Women, episode "To Love and to Murder", originally aired August 24, 2011.

== See also ==
- List of serial killers in the United States
- List of people executed in the United States in 1947
