= Samuel Frost (murderer) =

American murderer (1765–1793)

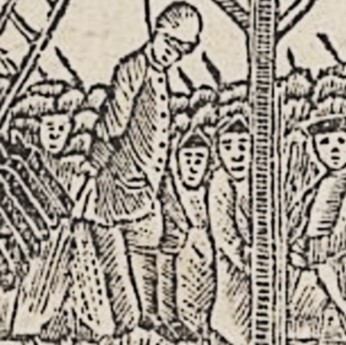
- Drawing of Samuel Frost at his execution
- Born: January 14, 1765; Princeton, Massachusetts, Great Britain
- Died: October 31, 1793 (aged 28); Massachusetts, United States
- Years active: 1783 – 1793
- Status: Executed by hanging
- Conviction: Murder
- Penalty: Death

Details
- Victims: 2
- Country: United States
- State: Massachusetts

Samuel Frost (January 14, 1765 – October 31, 1793) was an American murderer who was acquitted of murdering his father John Frost and later convicted of murdering Elisha Allen. He was then hanged at his highly publicized execution on October 31, 1793.

== Early life ==
Samuel Frost was born on January 14, 1765, in Princeton, a town in Worcester, Massachusetts. In 1779, when Frost, one of three children, was 14 years old, his mother died after falling ill. Frost thought that his father's abuse towards his mother was what caused her death.

== Murders ==
On September 23, 1783, at the age of 18, Frost murdered his father. While they were digging a ditch, Frost knocked his father over, and repeatedly stabbed him in the head with a handspike until his brains were exposed. Frost did this in retaliation for the death of his mother four years earlier. Frost was quickly apprehended and charged with murder. However, he was acquitted by reason of insanity during his trial in April of the same year.

After his acquittal, Frost was homeless. He would frequently do work for people in exchange for a temporary place to live. When he couldn't find anywhere to stay, Frost would live in the woods, surviving on apples and berries he found. One person he worked for was a man named Captain Elisha Allen. Allen would reportedly treat Frost like a slave. Frost ran away from Allen's estate several times, and was whipped by Allen as punishment.

On July 16, 1793, Samuel Frost murdered Elisha Allen. That afternoon, Allen ordered Frost to help him with his cabbage patch. While Allen kneeled to fix a plant in the garden, Frost hit him in the head with a hoe. After Frost hit him with the hoe two more times, Allen said "Forbear Sam, you done enough." Frost ignored Allen's pleas, and hit him at least thirteen more times, killing him. At his second trial, Samuel Frost pleaded guilty to the murder of Elisha Allen and was sentenced to death.

== Execution ==
Before his execution, Frost frequently read the bible. He also banged his head against the walls of his prison cell to feel how his victims felt. When asked what he would do if he was free, Frost responded that there was one more person that he wanted to kill.

Samuel Frost's execution happened on October 31, 1793, on a hill in Worcester, Massachusetts. After confessing to his murders in front of an audience of 2,000 people, he was blind-folded and his hands were tied behind his back. He was then hanged. His last words were "I declare that I ever had a great aversion to stealing and telling lies, and think them to be great crimes. I always meant to tell the truth, and never stole, except taking a few apples from orchards may be called so."

The hill that Frost was executed on became known as "Frost Hill" after his death.
