= Philip Bellino and Edward Gertson =

American murderers

- Born: Philip Belino; 1917; United States; Edward Gertson; 1913; United States
- Died: Philip Belino; May 9, 1947 (aged 30); Charlestown State Prison, Massachusetts, U.S. Edward Gertson; May 9, 1947 (aged 34); Charlestown State Prison, Massachusetts, U.S.
- Known for: Last people executed in Massachusetts
- Status: Executed by electrocution
- Conviction: First degree murder
- Penalty: Death

Philip Bellino and Edward Gertson (both died May 9, 1947) were the last people executed by Massachusetts.

== The murder ==
Bellino and Gertson were two gangsters convicted of murdering nineteen-year-old Robert "Tex" Williams, a former U.S. Marine. On August 3, 1945, Williams led Bellino, Gertson and Charles Mantia to a New Hampshire summer camp. He had learned there would be an illegal dice game taking place in the camp. The four men would rob the players at gunpoint. Williams had lured his accomplices with a promise of easily stealing up to $10,000. Instead they escaped with "a few hundred dollars".

The trio was enraged at Williams. They also feared the younger man could squeal on them to the police. On August 7, 1945, the four of them shared a taxi ride in the vicinity of Boston. The taxi stopped at an isolated location, not far from the shore. Williams, Bellino and Gertson stepped out for a walk. Mantia waited in the taxi with the cab driver. Bellino and Gertson returned without Williams, claiming the young man would spend his night with a girlfriend.

Williams' corpse was soon after discovered. He had been shot in the back of the head. Mantia was the one to lead the police to Bellino and Gertson. James Salah, the cab driver, also became a witness for the prosecution. On June 18, 1946, the duo were found guilty of first-degree murder in a trial by jury. There were originally 14 jurors. Two of them had been dismissed prior to the final verdict. A legal argument that this violated the rights of the defendants was eventually rejected by the Massachusetts Supreme Judicial Court. A "mercy bill" discussed at the time in the Massachusetts General Court could have proven beneficial to the duo, but was vetoed by Robert F. Bradford, Governor of Massachusetts.

== Execution and abolition of death penalty in Massachusetts ==
Both Bellino and Gertson were executed in the electric chair at the Massachusetts State Prison at Charlestown shortly after midnight on the night of May 8–9, 1947.

On April 3, 1951, Massachusetts enacted a "mercy bill" which removed the mandatory death sentence for murder in all cases except for murder committed in the course of rape or attempted rape. No further executions were carried out and in 1984 the Supreme Judicial Court of Massachusetts ruled that capital punishment violated the state constitution.

== See also ==
- Capital punishment in Massachusetts
- List of people executed in the United States in 1947
- List of most recent executions by jurisdiction

== Notes ==
| Preceded by Raphael Skopp | Executions carried out in Massachusetts | Succeeded by none |
