= Rebekah Chamblit =

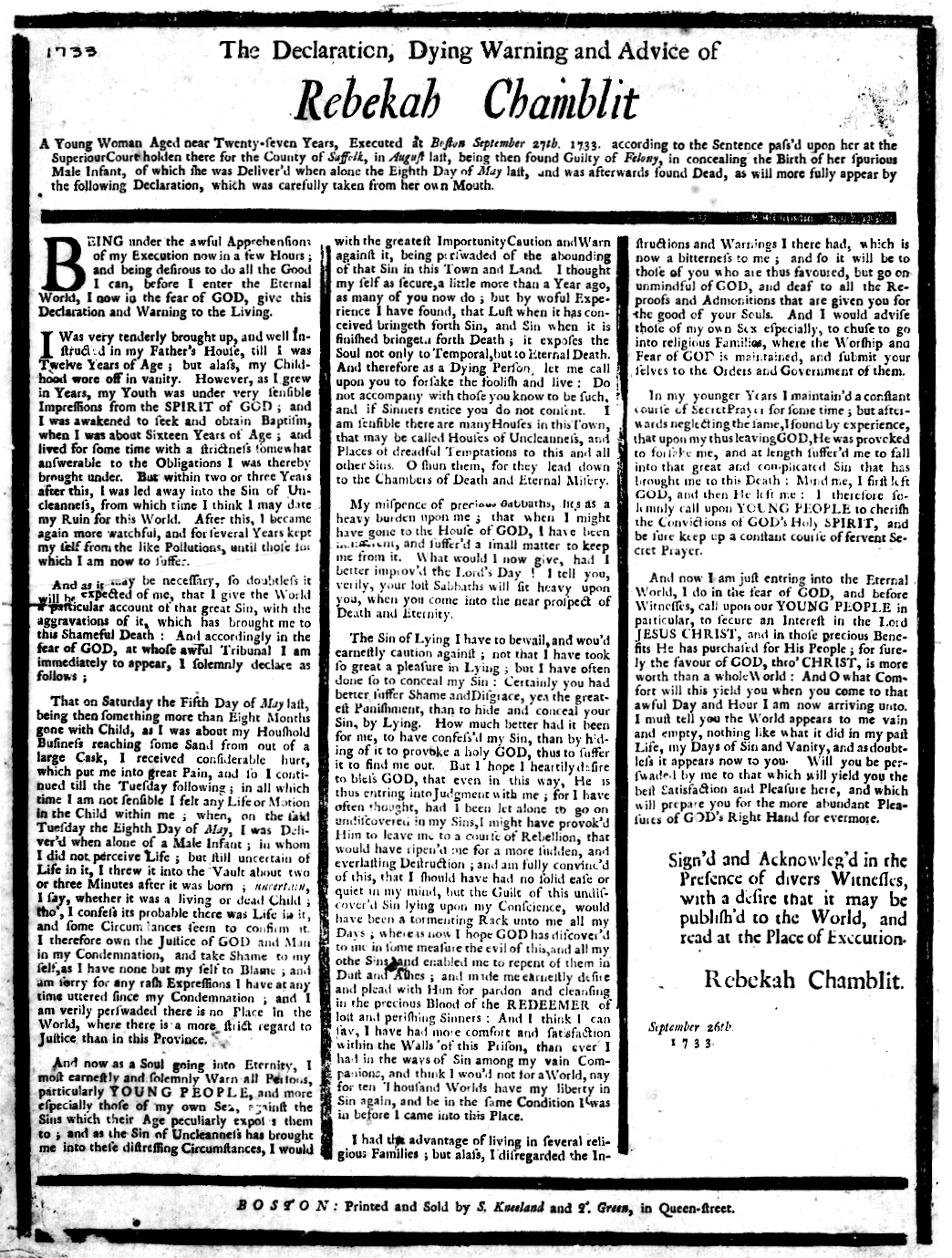
Chamblit's declaration, 1733

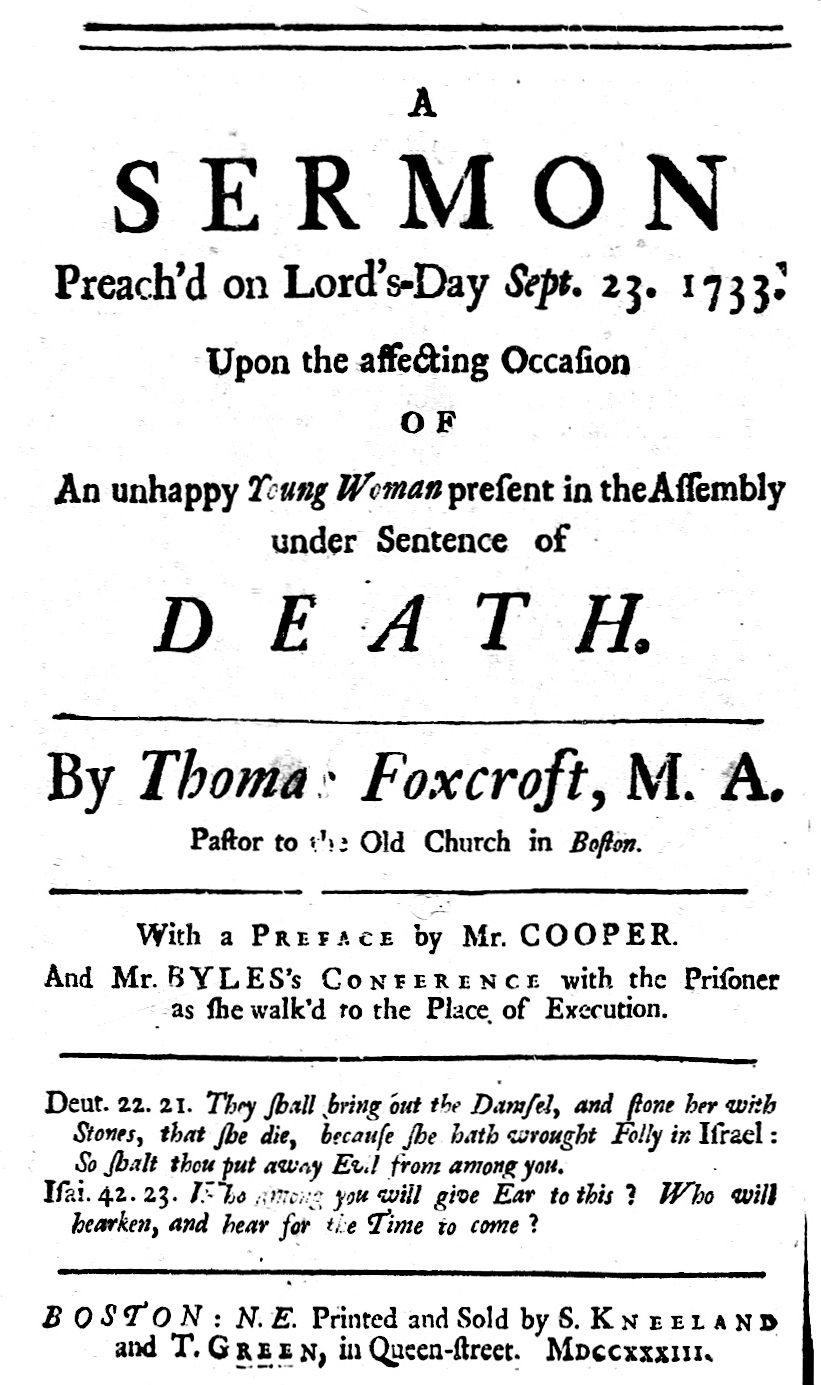
Foxcroft's sermon about Chamblit, First Church, Boston, 1733

Rebekah Chamblit (c.1706–1733) lived in Boston, Province of Massachusetts Bay, in the 18th century. She was tried and executed in 1733 for infanticide.

When she was 26 years old, an unmarried Chamblit became pregnant. In May, 1733, she gave birth to what was probably a stillborn. By her own account: "On Saturday the fifth day of May last, being then something more than eight months gone with child, as I was about my household business reaching some sand from out of a large cask, I received considerable hurt, which put me into great pain, and so I continued till the Tuesday following; in all which time I am not sensible I felt any life or motion in the child within me; when, on the ... Tuesday of the eighth day of may, I was delivered when alone of a male infant; in whom I did not perceive life...."

At length the situation was brought before a jury, "who brought in their verdict, Guilty. Accordingly ... the poor woman received Sentence of Death." Her "declaration," "read at the place of execution," September 26, 1733, may not have been in fact written by Chamblit herself; scholars suggest the text represents a forced confession.
