= Capital punishment in Massachusetts =

Capital punishment, more commonly known as the death penalty, was a legal form of punishment from 1620 to 1984 in Massachusetts, United States. This practice dates back to the state's earliest European settlers. Those sentenced to death were hanged. Common crimes punishable by death included religious affiliations and murder.

Federal crimes committed in Massachusetts may still be subject to the death penalty; for example, Dzhokhar Tsarnaev was sentenced to death by a federal court on May 15, 2015, for his role in the Boston Marathon bombing.

== History ==
The first recorded execution in Massachusetts was John Billington. He was executed by hanging on September 30, 1630, in Plymouth for murder of John Newcomen.

In the colonial era, Massachusetts' first settlers were Puritans. They came to Massachusetts from England aboard the Mayflower looking for religious freedom. As more people from England came to Massachusetts, they brought new religions and beliefs that conflicted with those of the Puritans. These first settlers created laws prohibiting the practice of other religions that disagreed with Puritan beliefs. Many of these people, specifically Quakers, were hanged for their beliefs. Mary Dyer was one of the Boston Martyrs hanged for being a Quaker. During the Salem witch trials (1692–1693), 19 individuals (14 women and 5 men) were executed for witchcraft by the colonial government.

On August 23, 1927, Italian immigrants Nicola Sacco and Bartolomeo Vanzetti were executed by electric chair at Charlestown State Prison for their conviction in the murder of a Correctional Officer and a paymaster during an armed robbery at the Slater and Morrill Shoe Company in Braintree on April 15, 1920.

Between 1788 and 1951, anyone convicted of first degree murder received the death penalty.

The last executions in Massachusetts were gangsters Philip Bellino and Edward Gertson for the murder of Robert Williams, a former U.S. Marine. Their executions took place on May 9, 1947. The two were executed via electric chair at Charlestown State Prison. Their deaths led to an investigation of the effectiveness of the death penalty in Massachusetts.

== Abolition ==
In 1980, in a freewheeling opinion quoting from various figures of the Western literary, historical, and philosophical canon (including Bacon, Aristotle, Dostoevsky, Kant, Shakespeare, Milton, Sartre, and Camus) the Supreme Judicial Court ruled 6-1 in Suffolk County District Attorney v. Watson that the death penalty statute violated Article 26 of the Massachusetts Constitution In 1982, Massachusetts voters effectively overturned Suffolk County District Attorney v. Watson by approving a legislatively referred constitutional amendment providing that no constitutional provision shall be construed as prohibiting the death penalty, with 60% of voters in favor.

Nevertheless, the Supreme Judicial Court ruled 5-2 that the state capital punishment statute was unconstitutional in 1984 in Commonwealth of Massachusetts v. Abimael Colon-Cruz as a violation of due process (Article 12 of the Massachusetts Constitution), because it allowed a death sentence only when the defendant had pleaded not guilty. The General Court passed a statute to reinstate capital punishment in 1986 but it was vetoed by then-governor Michael Dukakis. The Massachusetts Catholic Conference was key in gathering the Senate votes necessary to sustain the veto. From 1984 to 2014, when the General Court removed the death penalty statute from the General Laws, the General Court failed to amend the death penalty.

Since its abolition in 1984, capital punishment in Massachusetts has continued to stir debate. Most recently, the Boston Marathon bombing reignited the debate about capital punishment in the state, as the perpetrator Dzhokhar Tsarnaev was sentenced to death (but thus far not executed) by the U.S. Federal government. However, the Massachusetts General Court has continuously opposed the death penalty.

In 1997, an attempt by Republican Governor Paul Celluci to reinstate the death penalty was defeated by one vote in the General Court. In 2014, the General Court repealed the death penalty statute by a vote of 131-18 in the House and 35-4 in the Senate.

Following the homicide of a police officer in Yarmouth in April 2018 and a police sergeant in Weymouth in July 2018, Massachusetts Governor Charlie Baker stated that he supported making murder of police officers a capital crime.

== See also ==
- List of people executed in Massachusetts
- Crime in Massachusetts
- Law of Massachusetts
- Capital punishment in the United States
