= Joseph Medley =

American serial killer

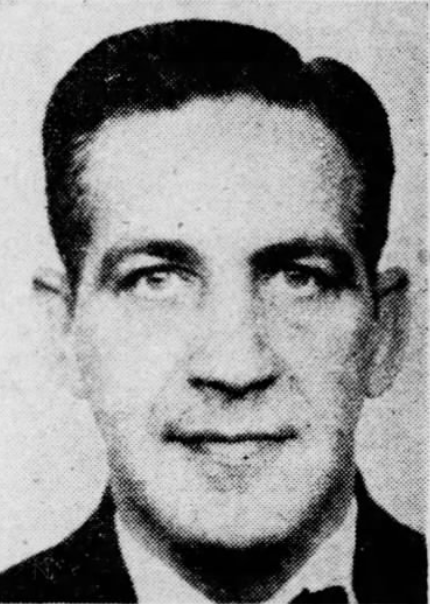
- Born: July 22, 1901; Pittsburgh, Pennsylvania, U.S.
- Died: December 20, 1946 (aged 45); D.C. Jail, Washington, D.C., U.S.
- Other name: Larry Fischer
- Status: Executed by electrocution
- Motive: Robbery
- Convictions: District of Columbia; First degree murder Michigan; Armed robbery
- Penalty: District of Columbia; Death; Michigan; 30 to 60 years imprisonment

Details
- Victims: 3
- Span of crimes: 1944–1945
- Country: United States
- States: Washington D.C., Illinois, and Louisiana
- Date apprehended: March 18, 1945

Joseph Dunbar Medley (July 22, 1901 – December 20, 1946) was an American serial killer who killed three women during robberies in Louisiana, Illinois, and Washington, D.C. between 1944 and 1945 after absconding from prison in Michigan, where he serving prison time for armed robbery. He was convicted and sentenced to death for the last murder committed in D.C., as the evidence in that case was the strongest. After briefly escaping from prison with a fellow death row inmate, Medley was executed in 1946.

Medley's three victims were all noted for having red hair.

== Early life ==
Medley was born in Pittsburgh in 1901. He later moved to Chicago, where he got a job as a purchasing agent. He got married, but later got a divorce. Medley served 20 months in prison in Arkansas for obtaining money under false pretenses. He then got a job as a field representative for the General Motors Acceptance Corporation, before being fired four months later due to his criminal record. Going forward, Medley never held another job. In 1933, he became the leader of a gang in Michigan that committed numerous robberies. In October 1933, Medley and his gang abducted and robbed Louis E. Brooks, a wealthy manufacturer. The gang escaped with $45,000 ($1,114,418.08 in 2026) in bonds and jewelry, but was discovered soon after. After a months-long manhunt, Medley was arrested in March 1934. He pleaded guilty to armed robbery and was sentenced to 30 to 60 years in prison.

== Escape and murders ==
On November 27, 1944, after working himself into a position of trust as a clerk for the prison warden, Medley absconded with $775 ($14,176.47 in 2026) raised in war bond by fellow inmates and moved to New Orleans and stayed at the De Soto Hotel. On December 22, 1944, he checked out after drowning Laura Fischer, a 28-year-old Austrian woman staying at the hotel, in her bathtub and stole her money and jewelry.

Medley then checked in at the Atlantic Hotel in Chicago. On December 17, 1945, he checked out of the hotel, after murdering 38-year-old Blanche Zimmerman with an overdose of benzedrine and alcohol after stealing her fur coat and two ruby rings.

On March 5, 1945, Medley attended an all-night poker party at the apartment of 50-year-old Nancy Boyer in Washington, D.C. under the pseudonym of Larry Fischer. After the other guests had left, Medley shot Boyer three times and stole her fur coat, an emerald ring, and several hundred dollars. By this point, however, Medley had been positively identified and was last reported seen at a hotel in St. Louis. He was arrested on March 18, 1945, after entering the room with another woman.

== Trial and execution ==
Authorities determined that the case against Medley in the murder of Boyer was the strongest. He was extradited to D.C. to stand trial. On June 9, 1945, Medley was found guilty of first degree murder and sentenced to death. On April 3, 1946, Medley and fellow death row inmate Earl McFarland, a World War II veteran who had been condemned for the rape and murder of 18-year-old Dorothy Berrum, escaped from the D.C. Jail. The two men gained the confidence of the guards and were allowed to play cards with two of them, Hubert Davis and Oscar Sanderlin in their room. During the game, Sanderlin said he was feeling ill and went to Medley's cell to lie in the bunk. Either Medley or McFarland then closed the cell door on him, after which the two overpowered Davis, locked him in McFarland's cell, and stole their uniforms and keys. They went to the roof of the jail after prying a ventilator open with a can opener, then traveled 60 feet to the ground with a rope made out of bedsheets. Medley was captured in a sewer near the Anacostia River eight hours later, while McFarland was captured in Tennessee on April 11 after a nationwide manhunt. After his capture. Medley, remarked, "You can't blame a guy for trying and I'm going to try again. I'm glad nobody was hurt." Following the incident, the two guards were suspended and federal authorities tightened security at the prison.

McFarland, 25, was executed on July 19, 1946. His last meal consisted of ham, eggs, toast, and coffee. His last words were, "I want to express my thanks and deep appreciation to everyone who has helped me. I still say I am not guilty of these crimes."

Medley was executed on December 20, 1946. Executed the same day were William Copeland and Julius Fisher for unrelated murders. Copeland had been convicted of murdering his sister-in-law, while Fisher had beaten Catherine Reardon, a librarian at the Washington Cathedral, to death after she complained about the way he had cleaned under her desk. All three men had a chicken dinner for their last meal.

== See also ==
- List of serial killers in the United States
- List of people executed by the District of Columbia
- List of people executed in the United States in 1946
