= Jarvis Catoe =

Executed American serial killer

- Press photograph of Catoe
- Born: November 2, 1904; Kershaw County, South Carolina
- Died: January 15, 1943 (aged 38); D.C. Jail, Washington, D.C., U.S.
- Other name: "D.C. Strangler"
- Status: Executed by electrocution
- Convictions: First degree murder Rape; Indecent exposure (4 counts)
- Penalty: Death

Details
- Victims: 1 conviction; 8 admitted; 11 suspected
- Span of crimes: 1935–1941
- Country: United States
- States: Washington, D.C. and New York
- Date apprehended: August 29, 1941

Jarvis Theodore Roosevelt Catoe (November 2, 1904 – January 15, 1943), sometimes referred to as the D.C. Strangler, was an American serial killer. Between 1935 and 1941, Catoe is believed to have raped and murdered at least eight women, and for the latter of the crimes he was executed via the electric chair.

Born in South Carolina on November 2, 1904, Catoe was the oldest of eight children and the son of a preacher. He reportedly acted normally until he sustained a head injury in 1925. Afterwards he began to show odd behavior, and is believed to have killed his first victim just four years later. Catoe was twice arrested for exposing himself in public, and racked up numerous arrests for traffic violations and other offenses. He served four months in jail after being convicted of two counts of indecent exposure in May 1935. In December 1935, he was convicted of another two counts of indecent exposure and served an additional five months in jail.

In August 1935, James Matthews Smith was arrested for the April 11, 1935, murder of 65-year-old Florence Dancy, whom Catoe later confessed to killing. In 1937, Smith was convicted of second degree murder and sentenced to life in prison. After Catoe's confession, the police stated that Smith may have been wrongfully convicted. However, appeals by Smith were dismissed after Catoe retracted his confession. In 1936, Smith was sentenced to 5 to 7 years in prison after being convicted of raping a woman in 1935. He had also faced charges of housebreaking, larceny, and bigamy in other cases.

While the true number of Catoe's victims is unknown, it is speculated that he could be responsible for numerous murders in the D.C. area after moving there in 1929 to live with his brother. According to Catoe himself, his modus operandi was to visit landladies posing as a handyman, and once they took him to a room to do work he would strangle them to death. He was convicted of first degree murder and rape in the March 8, 1941, slaying of Rose Abramowitz.

== See also ==
- List of serial killers in the United States
- List of people executed by the District of Columbia
- List of people executed in the United States in 1943
