= List of people executed by the District of Columbia =

Capital punishment in the District of Columbia has been abolished since 1981. However, a number of executions were carried out under the District's jurisdiction before then.

Before 1973, the District of Columbia was exclusively governed by Congress, which included establishing all local laws. Until 1962, the District of Columbia was the last jurisdiction in the United States with mandatory death sentences for first degree murder (the last U.S. state with mandatory death sentences for first degree murder was Vermont). Mandatory death sentences were abolished by the HR5143 (PL87-423), signed into law by President John F. Kennedy on March 22, 1962. Rape was also a capital offense.

The D.C. capital punishment law was nullified by the Supreme Court decision in Furman v. Georgia in 1972 and formally repealed by the D.C. Council in 1981.

The first recorded execution in District of Columbia was the hanging of James McGirk in 1802. The District moved its executions to the newly constructed D.C. Jail in 1872. Hanging was the method of execution used in the District until 1928, when it was replaced with electrocution. Executions were conducted at the far end of the jail's dining hall until an official execution chamber was added in 1940. The last execution under the authority of the District took place in 1957, when Robert Carter was executed.

The president of the United States has sole pardoning power in the District.

== List of non-federal executions in the District of Columbia ==
Name	Race	Age	Date of Execution	Crime	Victim(s)	President
James McGirk	White	?	October 28, 1802	Murder	Female, white (wife) (Note: McGirk's wife was pregnant and delivered her twin boys prematurely as a result of the attack. Neither of them survived.)	Thomas Jefferson
Patrick (Note: Only slave executed in the District of Columbia.)	Black	?	March 11, 1813	Attempted rape	Female, white	James Madison
Jonathan DeVaughn	White	70	June 27, 1827 (Note: Executed in Alexandria, Virginia, which was then part of the District of Columbia.)	Murder	Tobias Martin, white	John Quincy Adams
Daniel Woodward	White	?	September 2, 1853	Murder	Female, white (wife)	Franklin Pierce
James W. Powers	White	19	June 26, 1858	Murder	Edward Lutz, white	James Buchanan
Cornelius Tuell	White	?	July 8, 1864	Murder	Female, white (wife)	Abraham Lincoln
James Grady	White	33	March 24, 1871	Murder-Rape-Burglary	Fanny Faulkner, 75, white	Ulysses S. Grant
George W. Jenkins	Black	24	October 31, 1872	Murder	Lavinia Boston Jenkins, 20, black (wife)	Ulysses S. Grant
Barney Woods	White	37	December 6, 1872	Murder	Samuel M. Cheeseman, 47, white	Ulysses S. Grant
Charles Johnson	Black	32	December 10, 1872	Murder	Jane Eliza Johnson, 28, black (wife)	Ulysses S. Grant
Thomas Wright	Black	21	June 6, 1873	Murder-Robbery	Samuel Rogerski, 40, white	Ulysses S. Grant
Henry Young	Black	27	November 28, 1873	Murder-Robbery	Amos Franklin Hahn, 24, white	Ulysses S. Grant
James Madison Wyatt Stone	Black	35	April 2, 1880	Murder	Alberta Pitcher Stone, 29, black (wife)	Rutherford B. Hayes
Edward Queenan	Black	19	November 19, 1880	Murder-Robbery	George Phillip Hearth, 22, white	Rutherford B. Hayes
Joseph Bedford	Black	20	November 19, 1880	Murder-Robbery	George Phillip Hearth, 22, white	Rutherford B. Hayes
Charles Julius Guiteau	White	40	June 30, 1882	Murder	James A. Garfield, 49, white (president)	Chester A. Arthur
Charles Shaw	Black	19	January 19, 1883	Murder	Susannah Shaw Carter, 22, black (sister)	Chester A. Arthur
John Langster	Black	21	May 15, 1885	Murder	John H. Fowler, 42, white (police officer)	Grover Cleveland
Louis Sommerfield	White	54	April 30, 1886	Murder	Christiana Sommerfield and Gottlieb Eisenhaum, 52 and 43, white (wife and son-in-law)	Grover Cleveland
Richard Lee	Black	32	April 30, 1886	Murder	Mary Powell Lee, 30, wife (black)	Grover Cleveland
Antonio Nardello	White	22	May 28, 1886	Murder-Robbery	Carmine Rotunno, 50+, white (Note: Serial killer, confessed to also previously murdering Antonio Baldo and an unnamed Italian blacksmith in Maryland before his execution.)	Grover Cleveland
Nelson Colbert	Black	23	May 17, 1889	Murder	Philip Wentzell, 74, white	Benjamin Harrison
Benjamin Hawkins	Black	29	May 29, 1890	Murder	Cora Hawkins, 26, black (wife)	Benjamin Harrison
Howard J. Schneider	White	24	March 17, 1893	Murder	Amanda Hamlink Schneider, 22, white (wife) (Note: Also murdered her brother, Frank Hamlink (21, white).)	Grover Cleveland
Thomas Crumpton	Black	43	April 27, 1894	Murder	David Shanklin, 24, black	Grover Cleveland
James L. Travers	Black	24	July 19, 1895	Murder	Lena Gross, 20, black (girlfriend)	Grover Cleveland
Joseph A. Beam	White	56	July 26, 1895	Murder	Annie Goetz Leahy, 35, white (stepdaughter)	Grover Cleveland
John Harris	Black	23	February 14, 1896	Murder	Matthew Spruell, 35, black	Grover Cleveland
Irvin I. Ford	Black	30	June 26, 1896	Murder-Attempted rape	Elsie A. Kreglo, 16, white	Grover Cleveland
Charles Winston	Black	24	May 5, 1899	Murder	Emma Winston, 31, black (wife)	William McKinley
William M. Strathers	Black	25	May 5, 1899	Murder	Rose Talbot, 26, black (girlfriend)	William McKinley
Edward Smith	Black	47	May 12, 1899	Murder	Edmonia Jackson, 32, black (love interest)	William McKinley
George W. Horton	White	51	December 8, 1899	Murder	Jane Nicholson, 31, white (girlfriend)	William McKinley
Benjamin Hill Snell	White	42	June 29, 1900	Murder	Lizzie Weisenberger, 13, white	William McKinley
Nelson Vale	Black	69	July 6, 1900	Murder	Alexander Jackson, 29, black	William McKinley
Frank W. Funk	White	25	November 9, 1900	Murder-Burglary	William H. Brooks, 73, white	William McKinley
Elijah Chapman	Black	33	May 23, 1902	Murder	Ida Simms, 25, black (common-law wife)	Theodore Roosevelt
John Thomas St. Clair	Black	26	January 30, 1903	Murder	Daisy Madre, 24, black (girlfriend)	Theodore Roosevelt
Benjamin G. Hill	White	52	July 24, 1903	Murder	Carrie Marsden Hill, 41, white (wife)	Theodore Roosevelt
John Wesley Burley	Black	52	August 26, 1904	Rape	Adeline Taylor, 4, black (Note: Serial rapist, also attacked two other young girls in similar crimes.)	Theodore Roosevelt
Augustus L. Shaffer	White	39	February 10, 1905	Murder	Katherine Ivey Shaffer, 31, white (ex-wife)	Theodore Roosevelt
William Walter Hamilton	Black	27	February 2, 1906	Murder	Mary Elizabeth Butler, 27, black (common-law wife) (Note: Also known as Lizzie Lyman.)	Theodore Roosevelt
Charles Edward Grant	Black	21	November 16, 1906	Murder	Eva Barnes, 20, black (common-law wife)	Theodore Roosevelt
William Burge	Black	23	April 23, 1907	Murder	Daisy Jordan Burge, 19, black (wife)	Theodore Roosevelt
Joseph Paolucci	White	33	March 23, 1908	Murder	Elizabeth V. Dodge, 17, white (ex-girlfriend)	Theodore Roosevelt
Albert Brown	Black	23	June 29, 1908	Murder	Harvey Brown, 24, black (brother)	Theodore Roosevelt
Richard Gregory	Black	37	February 15, 1909	Murder	William A. Garner, 32, black	Theodore Roosevelt
Samuel William Rauen	White	26	February 14, 1913	Murder	Azalea Elizabeth and John M. Rauen, 19 and 23, white (wife and brother)	William Howard Taft
Nathaniel Green	Black	23	June 9, 1913	Rape	Adelaine E. Grant, 37, white	Woodrow Wilson
James F. Allen	Black	36	September 12, 1917	Murder	Flora Allen, 36, black (wife)	Woodrow Wilson
James H. Jackson	Black	27	March 2, 1920	Murder	Lillian Palma Hood, 22, white (Note: Also attacked Martha E. Gegan (46, white) and Florence Fowler (24, white).)	Woodrow Wilson
Frank Bowman	Black	39	October 22, 1920	Murder	Clarence J. Keefer, 26, white	Woodrow Wilson
William Henry Campbell	Black	22	March 11, 1921	Murder-Robbery	Gertrude Harrison Mann, 46, white (Note: Also a serial rapist, confessed to raping a black woman named Louise Simmons and two white women named Bessie Gleason and Mary Saunders. Two other black men, Forest Eaglen and Louis Randall, were wrongfully convicted for these rapes.)	Warren Harding
John McHenry	White	24	March 17, 1922	Murder-Robbery	James E. Armstrong, 41, white (police officer) (Note: Also murdered Wallace W. Mulcare (27, white).)	Warren Harding
Ernest A. Shands	Black	27	March 9, 1923	Murder	Catherine Spriggs Shands, 28, black (wife)	Warren Harding
George Spencer Banton	Black	20	April 20, 1923	Murder-Robbery	Samuel A. Frye, 39, white	Warren Harding
Charles Price	Black	32	May 3, 1923	Murder	Robert Smith, 50, black	Warren Harding
George Samuel Epps	Black	31	May 24, 1923	Murder	Katie Epps, 31, black (wife) (Note: Also murdered Louise Hodge (27, black).)	Warren Harding
Rufus Gordon	Black	37	June 23, 1923	Murder-Robbery	Simon Miller, 30, white	Warren Harding
Ralph Thomas	Black	42	January 15, 1925	Murder	Sadie Thomas, 26, black (wife)	Calvin Coolidge
Herbert L. Copeland	Black	50	January 22, 1925	Murder	David T. Dunigan, 63, white (police officer) (Note: Also murdered police officers John A. Conrad (37, white) and Lawrence H. McParlan (35, white). Suspected serial killer, also confessed to nine other murders.)	Calvin Coolidge
Philip Jackson	Black	30	May 29, 1928	Rape-Robbery	Daisy Welling, 35, white	Calvin Coolidge
Nicholas L. Eagles	White	31	June 22, 1928	Murder	Leo W. Karl Busch, 28, white (police officer)	Calvin Coolidge
Samuel Mareno	White	21	June 22, 1928	Murder	Leo W. Karl Busch, 28, white (police officer)	Calvin Coolidge
John C. Proctor	White	19	June 22, 1928	Murder	Leo W. Karl Busch, 28, white (police officer)	Calvin Coolidge
Andrew Jackson Hawkins	Black	33	June 5, 1930	Murder	Ruth L. Watkins, 21, black (girlfriend)	Herbert Hoover
Cardoza Bell	Black	24	March 6, 1931	Murder	Alice Metz, 25, black (girlfriend)	Herbert Hoover
Alfred Scott Aldridge	Black	28	May 6, 1932	Murder-Robbery	Harold J. McDonald, 30, white (police officer)	Franklin D. Roosevelt
John Logan	Black	24	June 29, 1932	Murder	Lamar Watson York, 36, white (Prohibition agent)	Franklin D. Roosevelt
John Borum	Black	26	June 29, 1932	Murder	Lamar Watson York, 36, white (Prohibition agent)	Franklin D. Roosevelt
Charles Morris	Black	33	March 12, 1932	Murder	Maggie Landon, 32, black (wife)	Franklin D. Roosevelt
William Clinton Robinson	Black	20	October 27, 1933	Murder-Robbery	Emanuel Solomon, 29, white	Franklin D. Roosevelt
Charles Edward Washington	Black	23	November 24, 1933	Murder-Robbery	Emanuel Solomon, 29, white	Franklin D. Roosevelt
Benjamin Montague	Black	29	December 1, 1933	Murder	Clara Williams, 36, black (common-law wife)	Franklin D. Roosevelt
Irvin Murray	Black	26	January 12, 1934	Murder	Milo John Kennedy, 28, white (Park Police officer)	Franklin D. Roosevelt
Joseph James Jackson	Black	20	January 12, 1934	Murder	Milo John Kennedy, 28, white (Park Police officer)	Franklin D. Roosevelt
Ralph Edward Holmes	Black	25	January 12, 1934	Murder	Milo John Kennedy, 28, white (Park Police officer)	Franklin D. Roosevelt
Ernest H. Bolden	Black	25	April 27, 1934	Murder	Elsie Plummer Bolden, 20, black (wife) (Note: Also murdered his mother-in-law, Janie Plummer (54, black).)	Franklin D. Roosevelt
George McKinley Pitmond	Black	34	June 1, 1934	Murder-Burglary	William Simms, 65, black	Franklin D. Roosevelt
Joe Goodman	Black	38	June 1, 1934	Murder-Burglary	William Simms, 65, black	Franklin D. Roosevelt
Albert Preston	Black	38	March 20, 1936	Murder	Clarence E. Yancey, 29, black	Franklin D. Roosevelt
John Homer Cummings	Black	29	April 23, 1937	Murder-Robbery	Joseph R. Wushnak, 42, white	Franklin D. Roosevelt
Willett Marcus	Black	23	April 23, 1937	Murder-Robbery	Joseph R. Wushnak, 42, white	Franklin D. Roosevelt
Norman Wesley Robinson	Black	29	March 18, 1938	Murder-Rape	Florence Daugherty Goodwin, 34, white	Franklin D. Roosevelt
Will Kinard	Black	38	February 2, 1939	Murder	Laura Kinard, 27, black (wife)	Franklin D. Roosevelt
William Isaac Robinson	Black	34	October 9, 1942	Rape	Elaine Caywood Henry, 15, white (Note: Suspected serial rapist, served 10 years in the West Virginia State Penitentiary for a similar crime and was charged for a second but released when the alleged victim failed to appear.)	Franklin D. Roosevelt
William Thomas Mumford	Black	22	December 18, 1942	Murder-Robbery	Fannie Cohen, 56, white	Franklin D. Roosevelt
Jarvis Theodore Roosevelt Catoe	Black	38	January 15, 1943	Murder-Rape	Rose Simons Abramowitz, 25, white (Note: Serial killer, also raped and murdered seven other women.)	Franklin D. Roosevelt
Monroe D. Neely	Black	37	December 14, 1945	Murder	Charles Riley Johnston, 24, white (police officer)	Harry S. Truman
Earl J. McFarland	White	25	July 19, 1946	Murder-Rape	Dorothy M. Berrum, 17, white (Note: Also the prime suspect in the rape and murder of Margaret Fitzwater (63, white).)	Harry S. Truman
William Copeland	Black	38	December 20, 1946	Murder	Dora M. Johnson, 34, black (sister-in-law)	Harry S. Truman
Julius Fisher	Black	32	December 20, 1946	Murder	Catherine Cooper Reardon, 37, white	Harry S. Truman
Joseph D. Medley	White	45	December 20, 1946	Murder-Robbery	Nancy Boyer, 50, white (Note: Serial killer, also robbed and murdered Laura Fischer (28, white) in New Orleans and Blanche Zimmerman (38, white) in Chicago.)	Harry S. Truman
Alfred Lorenzo Hawkins	Black	24	October 31, 1947	Murder-Robbery	John Paul Knight, 34, white	Harry S. Truman
Jesse James Patton	Black	23	December 10, 1948	Murder-Robbery	Maurice L. Bernstein, 52, white	Harry S. Truman
Reginald Joseph Wheeler	Black	28	December 10, 1948	Murder-Robbery	Maurice L. Bernstein, 52, white	Harry S. Truman
Shirley Harris	Black	24	January 14, 1949	Murder-Robbery	Frank C. Kelly, 56, white	Harry S. Truman
John H. Hall	Black	35	February 25, 1949	Rape (Note: "Carnal knowledge.")	Female, 8, black (Note: Also convicted of raping a 9-year-old girl and received a 30-year sentence in that case.)	Harry S. Truman
Theodore M. Holmes	Black	20	March 15, 1949	Rape	Sally Hinton, 9, white	Harry S. Truman
George A. Garner	Black	27	July 29, 1949	Murder-Robbery	Howard Jones, 37, black (Note: Also murdered James A. Hardy (32, black).)	Harry S. Truman
Lawrence J. Garner	Black	25	July 29, 1949	Murder-Robbery	Howard Jones, 37, black	Harry S. Truman
Frederick S. Pritchett	White	40	February 15, 1952	Murder	Clyde L. King, 50, white (Note: Previously convicted of second degree murder in Virginia and served 12.5 years in prison.)	Harry S. Truman
William Andrew Tyler Jr.	Black	20	July 26, 1952	Murder-Robbery	Oliver R. Hess and James C. Carpenter, 56 and 66, white	Harry S. Truman
Albert C. Allen	Black	25	March 20, 1953	Murder-Robbery	George Schomber, 39, white	Dwight D. Eisenhower
Robert Eugene Carter	Black	28	April 26, 1957	Murder-Robbery	George W. Cassels, 27, white (police officer)	Dwight D. Eisenhower

== Demographics ==
Race
White	26	25%
Black	79	75%
Age
Unknown	4	4%
17–19	4	4%
20–29	53	50%
30–39	29	28%
40–49	7	7%
50–59	6	6%
60–69	1	1%
70–79	1	1%
Gender
Male	105	100%
Female	0	0%
Date of execution
Before 1870	6	6%
1870–1879	6	6%
1880–1889	10	10%
1890–1899	11	10%
1900–1909	14	13%
1910–1919	3	3%
1920–1929	15	14%
1930–1939	20	19%
1940–1949	16	15%
1950–1959	4	4%
Method
Hanging	61	58%
Electrocution	44	42%
President (Party)
Thomas Jefferson (D-R)	1	1%
James Madison (D-R)	1	1%
John Quincy Adams (D-R)/(NR)	1	1%
Franklin Pierce (D)	1	1%
James Buchanan (D)	1	1%
Abraham Lincoln (R)/(NU)	1	1%
Ulysses S. Grant (R)	6	6%
Rutherford B. Hayes (R)	3	3%
Chester A. Arthur (R)	2	2%
Grover Cleveland (D)	4	4%
Benjamin Harrison (R)	2	2%
Grover Cleveland (D)	6	6%
William McKinley (R)	7	7%
Theodore Roosevelt (R)	11	10%
William Howard Taft (R)	1	1%
Woodrow Wilson (D)	4	4%
Warren Harding (R)	7	7%
Calvin Coolidge (R)	6	6%
Herbert Hoover (R)	2	2%
Franklin D. Roosevelt (D)	21	20%
Harry S. Truman (D)	15	14%
Dwight D. Eisenhower (R)	2	2%

== See also ==
- Crime in Washington, D.C.
