= Nardello =

Nardello is a surname of Italian origin. Notable people with that name include:

- Antonio Nardello (1864–1886), Italian serial killer
- Daniele Nardello (born 1972), Italian cyclist
- Gerry Nardello (active 2011–2012), American politician
- Vickie Orsini Nardello (born 1954), American politician
