= 7F08 =

7F08 may refer to:

- Advisory Neighborhood Commission district 7F08 in Washington, D.C.
- Dead Putting Society, a 1990 episode of The Simpsons
