= Herbert Copeland (murderer) =

Executed American murderer and suspected serial killer

- Born: Herbert L. Copeland; 1875; New York, U.S.
- Died: January 22, 1925 (aged 50); D.C. Jail, Washington, D.C., U.S.
- Cause of death: Execution by hanging
- Other names: Herman Copeland; Love Golden
- Motive: To avoid arrest
- Conviction: First degree murder
- Penalty: Death

Details
- Victims: 3–12
- Date: May 21, 1918
- Country: United States
- States: District of Columbia (convicted); Texas, South Carolina, Illinois (confessed)
- Date apprehended: For the final time in July 1923

Herbert L. Copeland (1875 – January 22, 1925) was an American murderer and self-confessed serial killer who was tried, sentenced to death and executed for killing two deputies and a police officer in the District of Columbia in 1918. Moments before being executed, Copeland confessed that he had killed 12 people in various states throughout his lifetime, but none of these could be definitively proven.

== Triple murder ==
On May 21, 1918, Copeland was sought after by authorities in the District of Columbia as a witness for a criminal case in La Plata, Maryland. Two men were dispatched to arrest him – patrolman John A. Conrad and Deputy Sheriff L. H. McParlan, both of whom were armed. When they entered his house, Copeland opened fire and killed both of them, before fleeing to his half-brother's house on 1400 Carrollburg Street. His location was quickly discovered and another officer, Lieutenant David T. Dunigan, attempted to apprehend him. In an ensuing gunfight, Dunigan was killed, but managed to significantly wound Copeland. After that, Copeland was interned at the Casualty Hospital, where he was to undergo an operation to treat his bullet wounds.

=== Escape and manhunt ===
While awaiting trial in jail, Copeland managed to escape under unclear circumstances. Immediately afterwards, authorities organized a nationwide manhunt for the fugitive, searching for him all across the country. A year after his capture, a man living in the Anacostia neighborhood was arrested on suspicion of being Copeland, but was later released. Over the next few years, there were numerous reports and alleged sightings of Copeland across the nation spanning from Alaska to his former home in Clinton, South Carolina. In December 1919, one report claimed that authorities had almost caught him in Iowa, where he was supposedly working as a day laborer, but Copeland managed to evade them. Other anonymous tips alleged that Copeland might have been killed by vigilantes and his body disposed of, but none of these claims could be confirmed with certainty.

== Arrest, trial and execution ==
In July 1923, police in Akron, Ohio, arrested a laborer named "Love Golden" on accusations that he was Copeland. Although the man initially vehemently denied that he was a fugitive from the law, he readily admitted his identity when he was brought to the court house to have his counsel assigned. As a result, his murder trial was appropriately scheduled for the coming months.

Copeland was tried, convicted and found guilty only for the murder of Dunigan, for which he was swiftly sentenced to death. A motion for a new trial from his attorneys was denied, and his execution date was scheduled for March 3, 1924. As his sentence was handed down before the passage of a bill that would replace hanging with the electric chair as the District's sole of method of execution, Copeland would be the last man executed in this manner in the District.

=== Confessions ===
On January 22, 1925, Copeland was hanged in the D.C. Jail before a crowd of 400 spectators. He was reportedly eager to "get it over with", and happily greeted his friends and acquaintances who had come to witness his execution. Copeland reportedly spent the last moments of his life singing religious hymns.

After his execution, C. Lucien Skinner, a reporter who had done the last interview with Copeland prior to his execution, announced that the convict had made two written confessions that he wished to be disclosed after his death. In the first confession, Copeland wrote that he had killed 12 people throughout his life – aside from the three officers in D.C., he had also killed a police officer in Chicago, Illinois; a man in Galveston, Texas; another man in South Carolina and several others in other Southern states. In the second confession, he claimed that the reason he had escaped was that two prison guards had decided to help him escape out of personal resentment towards Superintendent Louis Zinkhan, who had since been replaced. The nature of either confession could not be verified with certainty, and their truthfulness remains speculative.

== See also ==
- Capital punishment in the District of Columbia
- List of people executed by the District of Columbia
