= 7F07 =

7F07 may refer to:

- Advisory Neighborhood Commission district 7F07 in Washington, D.C., the 2013–2022 iteration of which is now district 7F08
- Bart vs. Thanksgiving, a 1990 episode of The Simpsons
