= Camillo Sbarbaro =

Italian poet and lichenologist

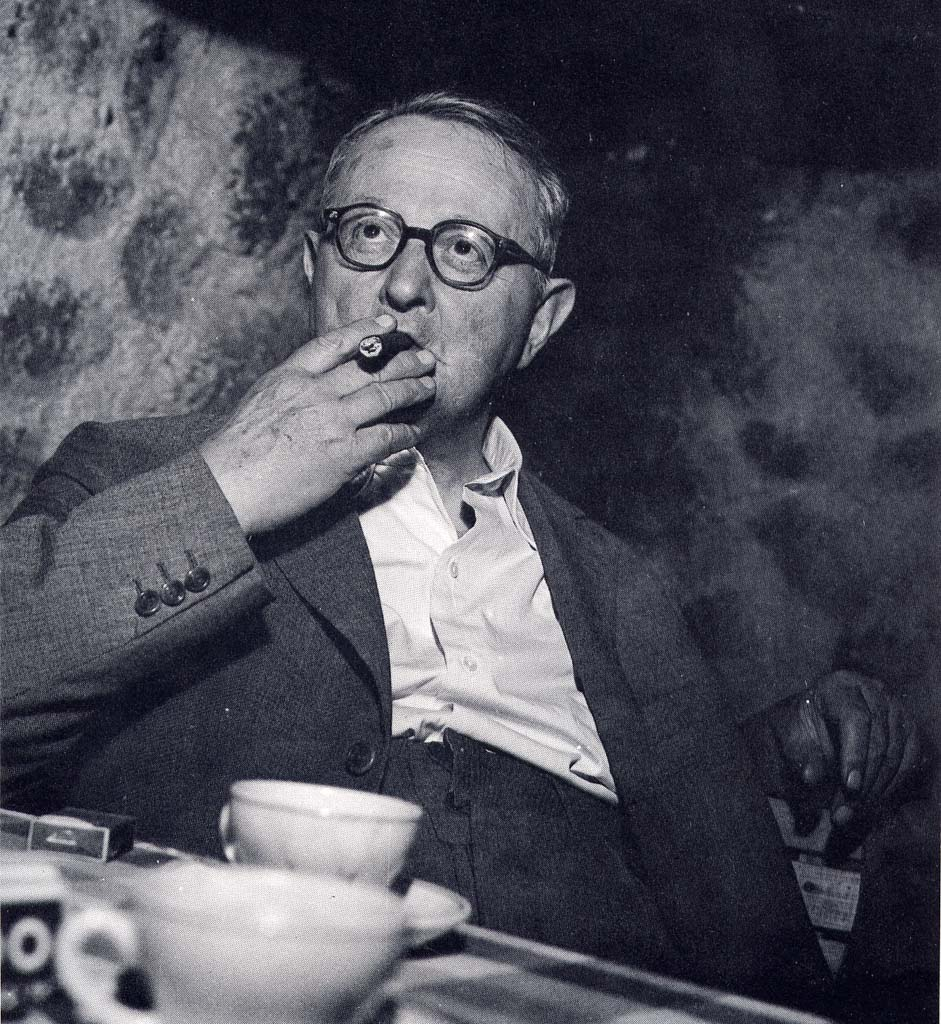
- Camillo Sbarbaro, probably taken 1959.
- Born: Pietro Sbarbaro; January 12, 1888; Santa Margherita Ligure, Genoa, Italy
- Died: October 31, 1967 (aged 79); Savona, Liguria, Italy
- Occupations: poet and writer; lichenologist
- Known for: poetry; prose writing; lichenology
- Notable work: Pianissimo (1914)

Camillo Sbarbaro (1888 - 1967) was an Italian poet, writer and lichenologist. His poetry collection Pianissimo (1914) was the start of his reputation. He was awarded the Feltrinelli Prize for literature from the Accademia Nazionale Reale dei Lincei in 1962.

== Early life ==
Camillo Sbarbaro was born 12 January 1888, in Santa Margherita Ligure, part of Genoa, in Ligura, Italy. His father, Carlo, was an engineer and architect. His mother, Angiolina Bacigalupo, died of tuberculosis in 1893 when he was about 5. He and his sister Clelia were raised by their aunt Maria, known as Benedetta. He later dedicated poems in his collection Pianissimo and Rimanenze to his father and aunt. In 1894, the family moved to the nearby town of Varazze, where Camillo began elementary school and later secondary school at the Salesian Institute in Varazze. In 1904, they moved to the nearby seaport of Savona. Sbarbaro enrolled at the Gabriello Chiabrera High School. He is known to have read poems by Arthur Rimbaud, who can be seen as an influence on the poems that he began to write at this time. He met and was encouraged to continue writing by Remigio Zena, who wrote in the Scapigliatura literary style. At the Chiabrera High School, his philosophy teacher was Adelchi Baratono, who enriched him intellectually and spiritually.

== Poetry ==
Sbarbaro obtained his high school diploma in 1908 and by 1910 he was working as an office clerk in the steel industry as in Savona as well as writing prose and poetry. His first poetry collection (Resine) was published in 1911 and he moved to Genoa the same year. However it was his move to Florence in 1914 and meeting with contemporary intellectuals Ardengo Soffici and Giuseppe Prezzolini, the founders of the magazine La Voce, that started wider appreciation of his poetry. His second collection Pianissimo (1914), started his reputation through reviews by critics such as Emilio Cecchi. His poems expressed existential unease in a calm, subdued manner; his spare, essential lyricism described the Ligurian landscapes in evocative colours, reminiscent of the work of Pascoli. He also met other writers and intellectuals associated with La Voce such as Giovanni Papini, Dino Campana, and Ottone Rosai.

When the Great War broke out, Sbarbaro volunteered for the Italian Red Cross. He was called up for military service in February 1917. In July, he left for the front. During this period, he wrote the series Trucioli, published in 1920. The war made him depressed and disillusioned.

During the summer 1919, he returned to Genoa, where he spent time with Pierangelo Baratono and the group of intellectuals associated with the symbolist poet Ceccardo Roccatagliata Ceccardi. In 1919, the magazine Riviera Ligure devoted its final issue to him. From 1927 he had a post teaching Greek and Latin in a school, the Arecco Institute in Genoa, but as the Italian fascist movement rose to power and required all teachers to join the Fasciet party, he was forced to resign because he would not join. In 1928 a volume of his prose writing, Liquidazione was published. In 1933 he contributed to the magazine Gazzetta del Popolo in Turin. He also completed the book Calcomanie and circulated typescript copies to friend, since censorship prevented official publication. It was published later, in 1940.

He was exempt from military service during the Second World War. He moved back to Spotorno to be with his sister and aunt, following a naval bombardment of Genoa in February 1941, which provided inspiration for his work Fuochi fatui. He returned to Genoa in 1945. After the war, some of his poetry was re-printed and there was renewed interest in his works. In 1951 he returned to Spotorno, effectively retiring, and remained there for the rest of his life. His last collection of poems, Rimanenze was published in 1955.

His works continue to be appreciated and researched by scholars. He was initially considered to be a minor poet because of his low output put, but since the 1970s the context of his work has been better appreciated and his reputation has increased. Pianissimo and Rimanenze are now considered his major achievements. In particular, the significant impact of Pianissimo on the direction of Italian poetry by his contemporaries has been recognised. It was a reaction to the Decadent movement of the late nineteenth and early twentieth centuries, as exemplified by the work of Gabriele D'Annunzio. Sbarbaro fits within movements looking for new language and a new style. Pianissimo strongly exemplifies the so-called "moralismo vociano" or "Crepuscolari" with its concern for existential, rather than purely formal ideas. Its tone is low key, subdued and anti-rhetorical with a dominant motif of wasteland. His style has been described as minimalist, and as well as being influenced by traditional and contemporary poetry styles, he developed his own style.

== Prose ==
Sbarbaro began writing prose contributions for magazines while he was quite young. For example, his pieces appeared in La Riviera Ligure between 1912 and 1919. While living in Spotorno in the 1940s he produced many translations of classical Greek, French and other poets and playwrights, and continued with translations after his return to Genoa after the war ended. He also contributed to several magazines such as Officina, Letteratura, Itinerari, Ausonia, La Fiera Letteraria and Il Mondo. and After he retired to Spotorno for the final time, several collections of his prose were published during the 1950s and 1960s.

== Awards ==
In 1949 he and Angelo Barile were given the Saint-Vincent poetry prize. This award for new poetry had been established in 1948. Sbarbaro's collection Trucioli was recognised as distinguished work even though the work was a revision of poems he had written between 1914 and 1940. In 1955 he shared the international Etna-Taormina prize for poetry with Jules Superville. In 1962 he was a recipient of a quinquennial Feltrinelli Prize for literature from the Accademia Nazionale Reale dei Lincei, the national academy for the arts and sciences of Italy.

== Lichenology ==
After leaving his job in 1919, he earned a living by tutoring Greek and Latin, and developed a passion for botany, especially collecting and studying lichens, being drawn to their aesthetics. He was introduced to lichenology by G. Gresino (1859–1946), a priest who had learnt about lichens from Francesco Baglietto. Sbarbaro was almost the only person collecting lichens in Italy in the early twentieth century. Although he worked alone, international lichenologists received his material and provided identifications for most of it. In 1928 he sold his first collection of mosses in Stockholm. Another collection, of about 2700 lichens is held by the Natural History Museum in Genoa. Further lichens collected by him are held at the Field Museum of Natural History, Chicago, USA as well as other museums. Between 1928 and 1933, as well as collecting in Italy, he travelled extensively in northern and southern Southern Europe as well as North and South America to collect specimens and meet with lichenologists.

He is estimated to have collected at least 127 new species of lichens and 20 species were named after him.

== Death ==
He died 31 October 1967 in Savona.

== Works ==
=== Poetry ===
- Resine, Caimo, Gênes 1911
- Pianissimo, Edizioni de La Voce, Florence, 1914
- Trucioli (1914–1918), Vallecchi, Florence, 1920
- Liquidazione, (1914–1918), Ribet, Turin, 1928
- Rimanenze, All'Insegna del Pesce d'Oro, Milan, 1955
- Primizie, Scheiwiller, Milan, 1958
- Poesie, All'Insegna del Pesce d'oro, Milan, 1961

=== Prose ===
- Fuochi fatui, All'insegna del Pesce d'Oro, Milan, 1956
- Scampoli, Vallecchi, Florence, 1960
- Gocce, Scheiwiller, Milan, 1963
- Quisquilie, Scheiwiller, Milan, 1967

== Lichenology ==
- Sbarbaro, C. (1967) Licheni (Lichens. A Sample Kit of the World) (posthumous publication)
- Sbarbaro, C. (1939) Aliquot lichenes oceanici in Cook insulis (Tonga, Rarotonga, Tongatabu, Eua) collecti. Archivio Botanico 15 100–104.
- Sbarbaro, C. (1932) Contributo alla flora lichenologica ligure. Archivio Botanico 8 207–255.
- Sbarbaro,C (1930) Licheni italiani nuovi o interessanti. Archivio Botanico 6 9–15.
