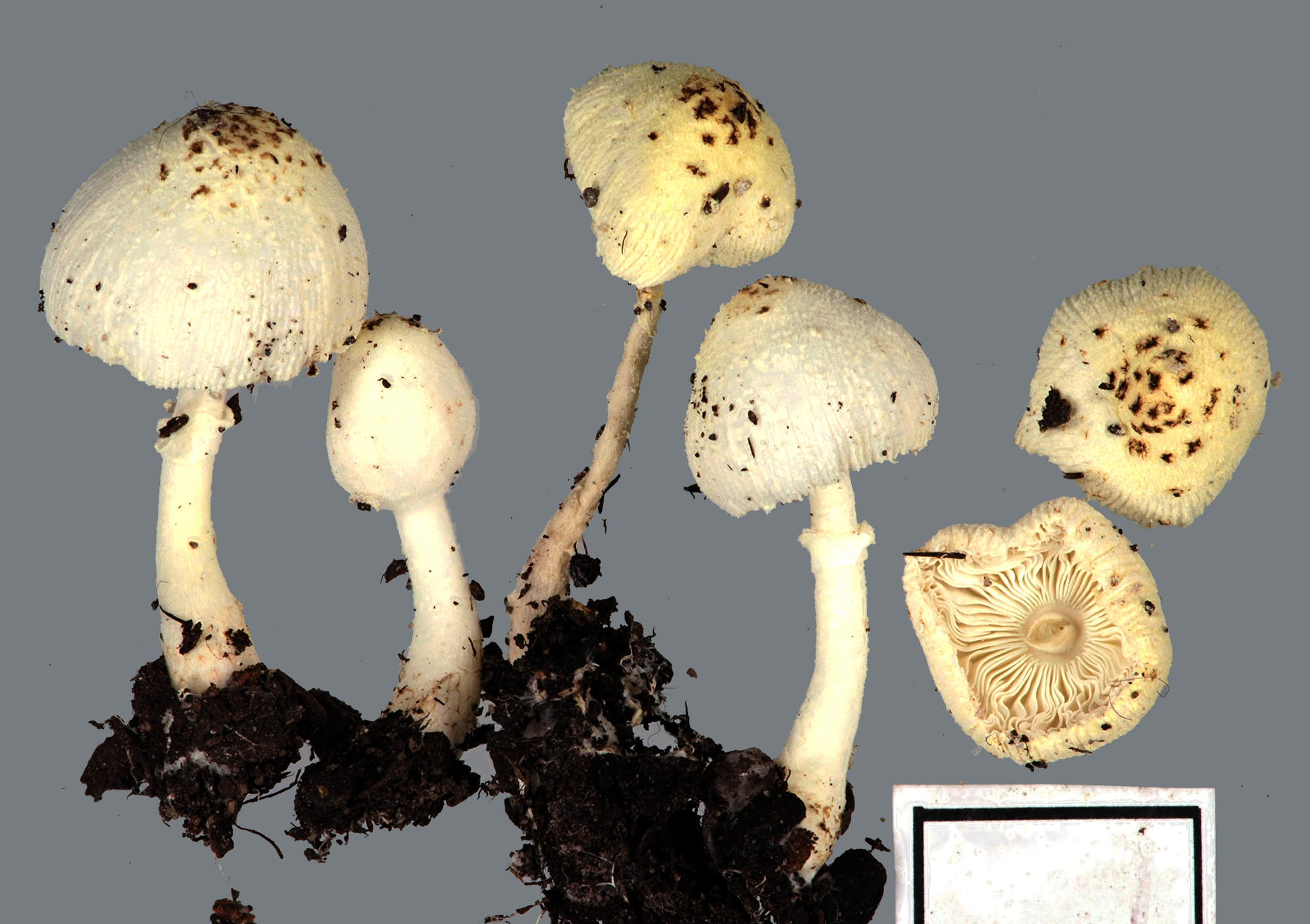

Scientific classification
- Kingdom: Fungi
- Division: Basidiomycota
- Class: Agaricomycetes
- Order: Agaricales
- Family: Agaricaceae
- Genus: Leucocoprinus
- Species: L. straminellus

Binomial name
- Leucocoprinus straminellus (Bagl.) Narducci & Caroti (1995)

Synonyms
- Agaricus straminellus Bagl. (1865); Lepiota straminella Sacc (1887); Mastocephalus straminellus Kuntze (1891); Lepiota cepistipes var. straminella Konrad & Maubl. (1924); Agaricus denudatus Rabenh (1867); Lepiota denudata Sacc (1887); Mastocephalus denutatus Kuntze (1891); Leucocoprinus denudatus Singer (1951); Hiatula denudata Singer (1951); Lepiota boudieri Guég. (1908); Lepiota gueguenii Sacc & Traverso (1910); Leucocoprinus gueguenii Locq. (1943)

= Leucocoprinus straminellus =

Species of fungus

Leucocoprinus straminellus
- Mycological characteristics
- Gills on hymenium
- Cap is campanulate or ovate
- Hymenium is free
- Stipe has a ring
- Spore print is white
- Ecology is saprotrophic
- Edibility is unknown

Leucocoprinus straminellus is a species of mushroom producing fungus in the family Agaricaceae. Like other Leucocoprinus species it may have originated in a tropical climate but now finds a home in plant pots, greenhouses and compost piles in many countries. Leucocoprinus straminellus is described as being similar to the more commonly known Leucocoprinus birnbaumii but it is smaller and a lighter shade of yellow with smaller spores that lack a germ pore. It is also described as being superficially similar to Leucocoprinus fragilissimus but slightly more robust with flesh that is less translucent.

== Taxonomy ==
It was first described in 1865 by the Italian botanist Francesco Baglietto who classified it as Agaricus straminellus.

In 1887 the Italian mycologist Pier Andrea Saccardo classified it as Lepiota straminella.

It was reclassified as Leucocoprinus straminellus by the Italian mycologists Roberto Narducci and Vincenzo Caroti in 1995. However it is still sometimes referred to by its former name Leucocoprinus denudatus which it acquired in 1951 when classified by the German mycologist Rolf Singer.

In 1999 the variant Leucocoprinus straminellus var. albus was described by the mycologists Vincenzo Migliozzi & Marcello Rava. This is now considered a synonym.

== Description ==
Leucocoprinus straminellus is a small dapperling mushroom with thin whitish to pale yellow flesh.

Cap: 1.5-2.5 cm wide, ovoid to campanulate (bell shaped) maturing to convex or almost flat with age but retaining the umbo. The surface is whitish yellow with a darker yellow centre and the margins are striated. Stem: 2.4–5 cm tall tapering upwards from a swollen base. The stem ring is located towards the top of the stem (median-superior) but quickly disappears. Gills: Free with a collar, distant and white-cream. Spore print: White. Spores: Ellipsoid to spherical and smooth. Dextrinoid. 5-6 x 4-4.5 μm. Taste: Indistinct. Smell: Indistinct.

The description of Leucocoprinus denudatus (now considered a synonym) from 1981 includes the following details:

Cap: 1.6-2.4 cm wide. Ovoid to campanulate or hemispheric and expanding with age to become convex or flat. Pale greenish-yellow in colour with the centre presenting with a deeper colour. The cap edges are paler and have striations. The centre of the cap is velvety in texture whilst the rest of the cap is covered in a fine powdery substance (pruinose) when examined under a lens. Gills: Crowded and free, tinted pale yellow or the same colour as the cap. Stem: 1.5-4.5 cm long and 2-3mm thick at the top, 4-6mm at the base. Paler yellow than the cap with a small, membranous stem ring that is high up (superior). The stem texture is smooth or very finely pruinose when examined with a lens and the base is often covered with soil. Spores: Globose to subglobose to broadly ovoid, with a minute apiculus, lacking a germ pore. 3.6-4.5 x (3.6) 4-4.8 μm and rarely up to 6-8 x 5.2μm. Pale yellow to rust yellow in Melzer's reagent. Basidia: 24-36 x 5-8μm, narrowly clavate to nearly cylindrical.

Dried specimens present with a brown umbo whilst the rest of the cap is yellow however dry immature specimens may develop brownish tones on the rest of the cap.

Due to the similarities with Leucocoprinus flavescens these species may often be confused resulting in inconsistencies in descriptions.

== Habitat and distribution ==
Specimens studied in 1981 where found in June at the University of Michigan Botanical Garden. They were growing in dense clusters. This was the first observation of the species in North America but it is more commonly found in Europe.

== Similar species ==
Leucocoprinus flavescens is described similarly with some sources suggesting they may be synonymous although they appear to have different sized spores and different coloured cap centres.
