= Robert Eugene Carter =

Last person executed in Washington, D.C. (1929–1957)

Robert Carter
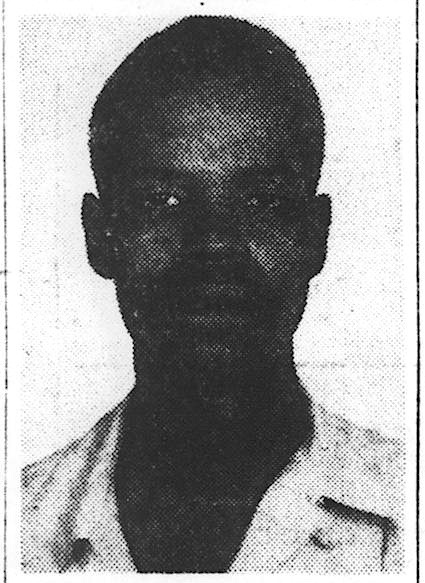
- Born: Robert Eugene Carter; February 11, 1929; Washington, D.C., U.S.
- Died: April 26, 1957 (aged 28); D.C. Jail, Washington, D.C., U.S.
- Cause of death: Execution by electrocution
- Known for: Final person executed in the history of Washington, D.C.
- Status: Executed
- Motive: To avoid arrest
- Convictions: First degree murder Robbery
- Penalty: Death

Details
- Victims: Private George W. Cassels, 26
- Date: July 11, 1953
- Date apprehended: July 12, 1953

Robert Eugene Carter (February 11, 1929 – April 26, 1957) was an American man who was convicted of the 1953 murder of a Washington, D.C. police officer named George Cassels, whom Carter shot during a foot chase from a holdup Carter had committed immediately prior. Carter's execution on April 26, 1957, made him the final person to be executed prior to the death penalty's abolition in the District of Columbia in 1981.

== Background ==
Robert Carter was born on February 11, 1929, to William and Martha Carter. He was African American. At the time of his death, he was married to Ruby Carter, and they had two young children, a girl and a boy; at the time of Cassels' murder, Carter's wife was pregnant with a third child.

Carter had no criminal record prior to the robbery and murder that resulted in his death sentence. Newspapers described Carter as a "laborer" who had been struggling to find consistent work for weeks prior the murder. Carter had attempted to find work as a bus driver but failed due to his lack of qualifications; he also attempted to find work with a vending machine company. Carter claimed to have chanced upon the murder weapon lying on the ground near a bus stop two weeks prior to the murder of Cassels, and that his initial intention with the gun was to sell it for quick money and that he did not initially want to use it in the commission of a crime, but he could not find anyone willing to purchase the gun.

== Robbery and murder ==
On July 11, 1953, at approximately 5:00 pm, Carter robbed a dry cleaning business of an amount of money between $54 and $115 USD ($651.12 and $1,386.65 in 2026), striking the owner of the business in the head with the barrel of his gun and then taking money out of the cash register while the owner was disabled. An off-duty police officer with the District of Columbia's third precinct who happened to be nearby during the robbery, 26-year-old Private George W. Cassels, gave chase to Carter on foot following a verbal prompt from the business owner to "stop that man". During the chase, Carter shot Cassels one time.

Immediately after the shooting, Carter attempted to go into hiding to avoid capture; he ran to his own home, which was located one block from the murder scene, and hid there while police officers questioned his wife regarding his whereabouts. His wife denied having seen him, and police then moved on from the Carters' home. Carter then changed clothes and hid the weapon, a German Luger, in a closet. He joined some friends to ride around town and visit other friends and relatives in the area around Silver Spring, Maryland. It was during one of these visits that police officers arrested Carter, nine hours after Cassels was shot and before Cassels died. In fact, Cassels did not immediately die from his wound; he remained conscious most of the day, and 228 volunteers, including 50 police officers, contributed at least 47 pints of his blood type ("O" type blood). Nevertheless, Cassels died on July 12, 25 hours after sustaining his gunshot wound. Doctors declared his cause of death to be a bullet that punctured his large and small intestines, liver, and kidney.

During Carter's confession, he told a police captain that he shot Cassels because Cassels was gaining ground on Carter during the chase. Police recovered the Luger from Carter's closet. At least three independent witnesses identified Carter from a police lineup, including a 7-year-old boy who witnessed Cassels' murder while playing in the street, the owner of the cleaning shop Carter initially robbed, and one of Cassels' colleagues. In his confession, Carter also denied stealing $115, claiming he only successfully stole $54 from the dry cleaner's. He also said his family's financial problems and his desperation motivated him to carry out the robbery, especially in light of his wife's third pregnancy. According to Cassels' wife, during an inquest at the morgue where Cassels' body lay after the murder, Carter's wife told Cassels' wife that "[Carter] did it because there was no food in the house." In a 1992 retrospective interview, Cassels' wife stated, "I think he was desperate. He died trying to feed his children. On the other hand, the churches will give you food if you're starving. He did it. He paid the price."

After his capture, Carter was charged with murder and robbery. During a hearing held before a grand jury, a police sergeant described the chase and stated that Carter issued a four-page written confession to the robbery, chase, and murder.

== Trial and appeals ==
Carter's three-day trial began and ended in February 1954. The jury deliberated for one hour before finding Carter guilty of first degree murder and robbery on February 23. Carter did not receive a sentence for the robbery, but in accordance with D.C. law at the time, death sentences were mandatory for first degree murder convictions. Immediately after the conviction, Carter's defense attorney announced an intention to appeal the sentence.

Carter's execution was initially scheduled to take place on October 15, 1954, but his appeals led to delays while federal appellate courts heard his arguments. A second execution date of January 14, 1955, was also delayed because of appeals. In May 1955, the United States Court of Appeals for the District of Columbia upheld Carter's conviction and sentence. Carter argued that his first degree murder conviction was invalid because first degree murder in D.C. law was "murder while committing a felony," and the aggravating felony that made his conviction eligible for a first degree murder classification, robbery, had already been completed by the time the murder occurred. In January 1956, the United States Supreme Court refused to review Carter's case.

== Execution ==
Two days before Carter's execution, prison officials permitted him to see his mother, wife, and children, at which point he met his third child, then four years old, for the first time. The night before his execution, Carter was in what newspapers described as a "catatonic state."

Carter was executed on April 26, 1957, at 10:37 am. The method of execution the District of Columbia used at the time was the electric chair, which was located in a cubicle on the fourth floor of the District Jail. Carter's electrocution marked the first time Washington D.C. carried out an execution since that of Albert Allen on March 29, 1953, more than four years prior.

At his execution, witnesses described Carter as emotionless, although he smiled at the jail's Catholic chaplain, who attended the execution, and uttered several prayers. Carter was 28 at the time of his death. His funeral took place on April 30, 1957, at 2:00 pm, in Maryland.

== Aftermath and abolition ==
In December 1954, Private George W. Cassels received a posthumous service-related gold medal.

The four-year gap between Albert Allen's execution and Carter's execution was by far the longest in D.C. history, denoting a slowdown in the pace of the death penalty's application in D.C. In 1962, D.C. banned the practice of applying a mandatory death penalty for first-degree murder verdicts. Despite Carter's execution being the last to take place in Washington, D.C., the district did not abolish the death penalty for almost 25 years. The Furman v. Georgia ruling in 1972 effectively nullified the death penalty in every U.S. jurisdiction that still retained it at that time, D.C. included; however, the D.C. Council did not formally abolish the death penalty until 1981. In 1992, lawmakers attempted and failed to pass a referendum that proposed reinstating the death penalty in the district.

As of 2023, the electric chair D.C. officials used to execute Carter resides in the D.C. Archives.

== See also ==
- Capital punishment in the District of Columbia
- Capital punishment in the United States
- List of people executed in the United States in 1957
- List of most recent executions by jurisdiction
- List of people executed by the District of Columbia
- List of people executed by electrocution
