= Herbert Copeland =

Herbert Copeland may refer to:

- Herbert Copeland (biologist) (1902–1968), American biologist
- Herbert Copeland (murderer) (1875–1925), American murderer and self-confessed serial killer
