= Joel Castón =

American politician

Member of D.C. Sentencing Commission
- Incumbent
- Assumed office February 6, 2024

Commissioner of Advisory Neighborhood Commission 7F
- In office June 29, 2021 – January 2, 2023

Personal details
- Born: 1976 or 1977 (age 48–49) Washington, D.C., U.S.

Joel Castón (/dʒoʊˈɛl kæsˈtoʊn/, joe-EL kas-TONE) is an American politician and convicted murderer who is currently serving on the Washington, D.C. Sentencing Commission. In 2021, Castón was elected to serve as the commissioner for Advisory Neighborhood Commission (ANC) district 7F07 while imprisoned in the D.C. Jail for murder, where he completed his sentence of over 20 years prior to being paroled. He became the first incarcerated person to win an election in the city and served on the ANC from June 2021 to January 2023. The election was the first in U.S. history where both the electorate and winning candidate were incarcerated. In February 2024, Castón was appointed to the D.C. Sentencing Commission, which helps shape sentencing guidelines for judges and prosecutors in D.C. Superior Court.

== Early life and incarceration ==
Castón was raised in Ward 8 of Washington, D.C. His parents separated when he was a child due to his father's alcoholism. At age 12, Castón began dealing drugs with his cousins. When he was fifteen, his house was destroyed in a fire and his family was left homeless. In November 1994, Castón was charged with first degree murder in the shooting death of Rafiq Washington which occurred on August 14, 1994. In 1996, he was sentenced to 35 years to life. Castón was incarcerated a federal prisons until he was transferred to the D.C. Jail in 2016.

While incarcerated, Castón earned a GED and took courses hosted by Georgetown University. Castón also led a jail newspaper and wrote papers on criminal justice reform. He was a Christian worship music leader, a financial literacy officer, and started a mentorship program called the Young Men Emerging Program.

Kim Kardashian filed a motion for Castón's release. He was granted parole in April 2021, and released from prison in November 2021.

== Political career ==
In November, 2020, Castón sought to run for the vacant Advisory Neighborhood Commission seat 7F07, but was disqualified due to his voter registration showing his old address in Ward 8. On June 15, 2021, while still residing in the D.C. Jail, Castón was elected to fill the seat, winning about a third of the vote. The Advisory Neighborhood Commission seat had been created in 2013, but Castón was the first person to hold the seat and the first incarcerated person elected to public office in Washington, D.C. In the election, Castón beat four other incarcerated candidates.

Castón was sworn into office on June 29, 2021. While incarcerated, Castón was provided with an office within the D.C. Jail, including a computer and telephone, to perform his ANC duties. After being granted parole, he continued to represent the district while living at a new apartment complex across the street. He successfully campaigned to have a new district made for just the jail, to exclude the growing apartment complex. Leonard Bishop was sworn in as the first commissioner of the new district, 7F08, in 2023.

In January 2024, Castón was nominated to serve as one of 17 members of the D.C. Sentencing Commission, which would help shape sentencing guidelines in the city. US Attorney for the District of Columbia Matthew M. Graves opposed Castón's nomination, saying that current sentencing guidelines led to a "revolving door" for those prosecuted in the D.C., and that Castón would further reduce incarcerations during a period of rising crime. A vote on Castón's nomination, scheduled for January 9, 2024, was postponed by D.C. Council chairman Phil Mendelson, saying that the temperature was "too high" after Graves' objections. A majority of council members favored Castón's appointment, while mayor Muriel Bowser supported Graves' concerns. On February 6, Castón was appointed to the sentencing commission as one of 12 voting members. 12 city council members voted in favor of Castón, with one, Brianne Nadeau, voting present.

== Personal life ==
Castón has one daughter. Castón is a Christian. He speaks Spanish, French, Arabic, and Mandarin.
