= Luigia Pascoli =

Italian painter (1805–1882)

- Born: 1805; Monfalcone, Province of Gorizia, Italy
- Died: 1882 (aged 76–77); Bologna, Italy
- Occupation: Italian painter

Luigia Pascoli (23 October 1805 – 3 April 1882) was an Italian painter. She depicted genre scenes, often in pastel, and often made miniature copies of grand masters.

== Biography ==
She was born in Monfalcone, Province of Gorizia. She studied under her father, and with her sister Marianna Pascoli (1790–1846), but then in Milan studied under the engraver Antonio Nardello. She completed some illuminated manuscript work, in addition to portraits and genre works. She and her sister were close friends of Antonio Canova.

She was a resident of Venice. In 1870 at the Parma Exposition, she displayed a pastel Magdalen; in 1877 at Naples, she exhibited: First Love; a pastel La maschera; in 1881 at Venice: a copy of the San Marco by Titian; a copy of the Dinner at Emmaus by Giambellino; Una Puttina col gatto; Una Romana, and Una venditrice di uova nel costume veneto.

She died in Bologna.
