= Jonathan Magbie =

American quadriplegic

- Born: 1977; Maryland, U.S.
- Died: September 24, 2004 (aged 26–27); D.C. Jail, Washington, D.C., U.S.
- Known for: Quadriplegic who died in jail awaiting trial for drug possession

Jonathan Magbie (1977 – September 24, 2004) was an American quadriplegic who died in jail while serving a ten-day sentence for marijuana possession.

== Background ==
Magbie was paralyzed from the neck down after being struck by a drunk driver at the age of four.

In 2004, he was charged with marijuana possession after police found a marijuana cigarette, four grams of cocaine, and a loaded gun in the vehicle in which he was stopped. The driver of the car, Bernard Beckett, pleaded guilty to the gun charges. Magbie pleaded guilty to the marijuana.

Although Magbie had never previously been convicted of a criminal offense and although he required private nursing care for as much as 20 hours a day, Magbie was given a ten-day sentence in the D.C. Jail in September 2004 by D.C. Superior Court Judge Judith E. Retchin, who cited the gun or the cocaine as factors in the jail sentence. Lacking a ventilator, he died in city custody four days later. This provoked a series of op–ed pieces in The Washington Post by columnist Colbert I. King.

Magbie's mother, with the help of the ACLU, filed a lawsuit accusing the District government and Greater Southeast Community Hospital of failing to give him proper care. That lawsuit, and additional cases against Center for Correctional Health and Policy Studies, Inc. (which provided the medical care at the D.C. jail) and Corrections Corp. of America, were settled out of court for a total of $4.6 million.
