= Pascoli =

Pascoli is a surname. Notable people with the surname include:

- Giovanni Pascoli (1855–1912), Italian poet, freemason, and classical scholar
- Lione Pascoli (1674–1744), Italian abbot, art historian, collector, and economist
- Luigia Pascoli (1805–1882), Italian painter
