= Jennifer A. Di Toro =

American judge (born 1967)

Jennifer Di Toro
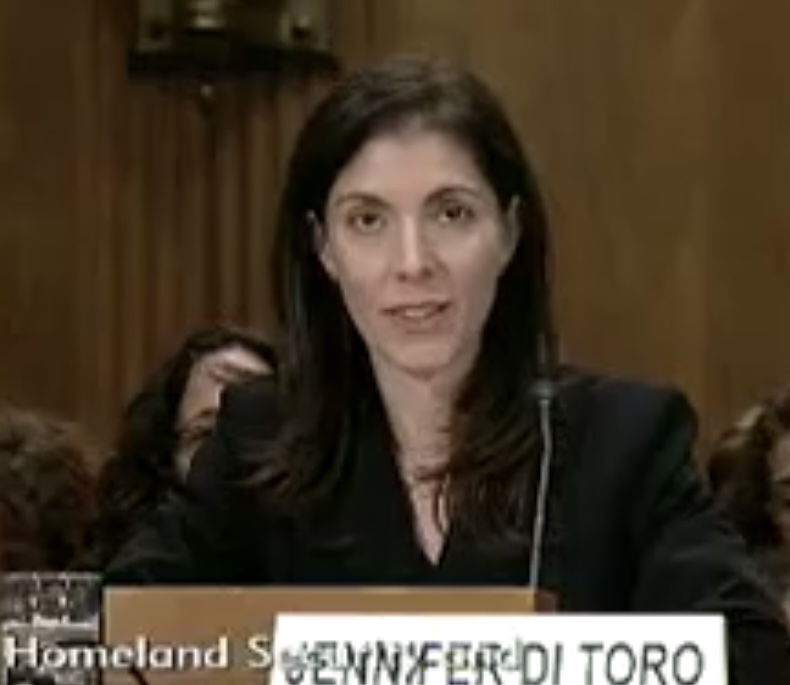

Associate Judge of the Superior Court of the District of Columbia
- Incumbent
- Assumed office October 14, 2011
- President: Barack Obama
- Preceded by: Judith E. Retchin

Personal details
- Born: Jennifer Ann Di Toro; May 6, 1967 (age 59) Princeton, New Jersey, U.S.
- Education: Wesleyan University (BA); University of Oxford (MPhil); Stanford University (JD); Georgetown University (LLM)

Jennifer Ann Di Toro (born May 6, 1967) is an associate judge of the Superior Court of the District of Columbia.

== Education and career ==
Di Toro earned her Bachelor of Arts from Wesleyan University in 1989, her Master of Philosophy from the University of Oxford in 1991, her Juris Doctor from Stanford Law School in 1997 and her Master of Laws from Georgetown University Law Center in 1999.

After graduating, Di Toro worked as an attorney at Zuckerman Spaeder, LLP. She later joined the Public Defender Service for the District of Columbia as a staff attorney in the Trial and Special Litigation Divisions. In 2004, she joined the Children’s Law Center where she served as Legal Director helping children and families get access to health care, education and permanent homes to those in need.

=== D.C. superior court ===
President Barack Obama nominated Di Toro on February 3, 2011, to a 15-year term as an associate judge of the Superior Court of the District of Columbia to the seat vacated by Judith E. Retchin. On June 15, 2011, the Senate Committee on Homeland Security and Governmental Affairs held a hearing on her nomination. On June 29, 2011, the Committee reported her nomination favorably to the senate floor. On August 2, 2011, the full Senate confirmed her nomination by voice vote. She was sworn in on October 14, 2011.

In November 2026, she gave probation instead of prison time, as requested by the District Attorney’s office, to Darius Drew, a 19 year old who had fired 20 rounds into a crowd playing basketball.Gun Crime Goes Unpunished
