= Judith E. Retchin =

American judge

Senior Judge of the Superior Court of the District of Columbia
- Incumbent
- Assumed office December 2010

Associate Judge of the Superior Court of the District of Columbia
- In office July 1992 – December 2010
- Nominated by: George H. W. Bush
- Preceded by: Bruce S. Mencher
- Succeeded by: Jennifer A. Di Toro

Personal details
- Born: Judith Ellen Retchin; May 24, 1952 (age 74) Amityville, New York, U.S.
- Education: George Washington University (B.A.); Catholic University of America (J.D.)

Judith Ellen Retchin (born May 24, 1952) is a senior judge of the Superior Court of the District of Columbia.

== Early life and career ==
Retchin grew up in West Babylon, New York. In 1970, she graduated from West Babylon Senior High School. In 1974, she received her B.A. from George Washington University. In 1978, she received her J.D. from Catholic University of America's Columbus School of Law. She worked as a trial attorney for the Civil Aeronautics Board and joined the United States Department of Justice Antitrust Division in 1980. She was in private practice from 1974 to 1977. From 1976 to 1978 she was a legal assistant for the Airports Operators' Council International.

== Prosecutor ==
In 1983, she was an Assistant United States Attorney for the District of Columbia. Retchin was the prosecutor in the drug trial of D.C. Mayor Marion Barry.

== Judge ==
President George H. W. Bush appointed Retchin to the bench of the Superior Court of the District of Columbia. She served as an associate judge from July 1992 to December 2010, when she became a senior judge. She presided over a case challenging the District's handgun ban in 2002.

== Jonathan Magbie case ==
In 2004, Retchin presided over the trial of Jonathan Magbie, a quadriplegic man who had been arrested for possession of marijuana. Retchin sentenced Magbie, a first-time offender, to ten days in jail despite the prosecution, as part of a plea bargain with the defense, agreeing not to oppose probation. Magbie, who required a ventilator to breathe at night (something the jail did not have), subsequently died four days into his sentence after being transferred to a hospital. The case provoked a series of op-ed pieces in the Washington Post by columnist Colbert I. King. A report by the Commission on Judicial Disabilities and Tenure concluded that Retchin had erred but cleared her of judicial misconduct. Magbie's mother called Retchin a killer and demanded her removal from the bench.
