= Advisory Neighborhood Commission district 7F08 =

District of Advisory Neighborhood Commission 7F

- Constituency for the Advisory Neighborhood Commissions
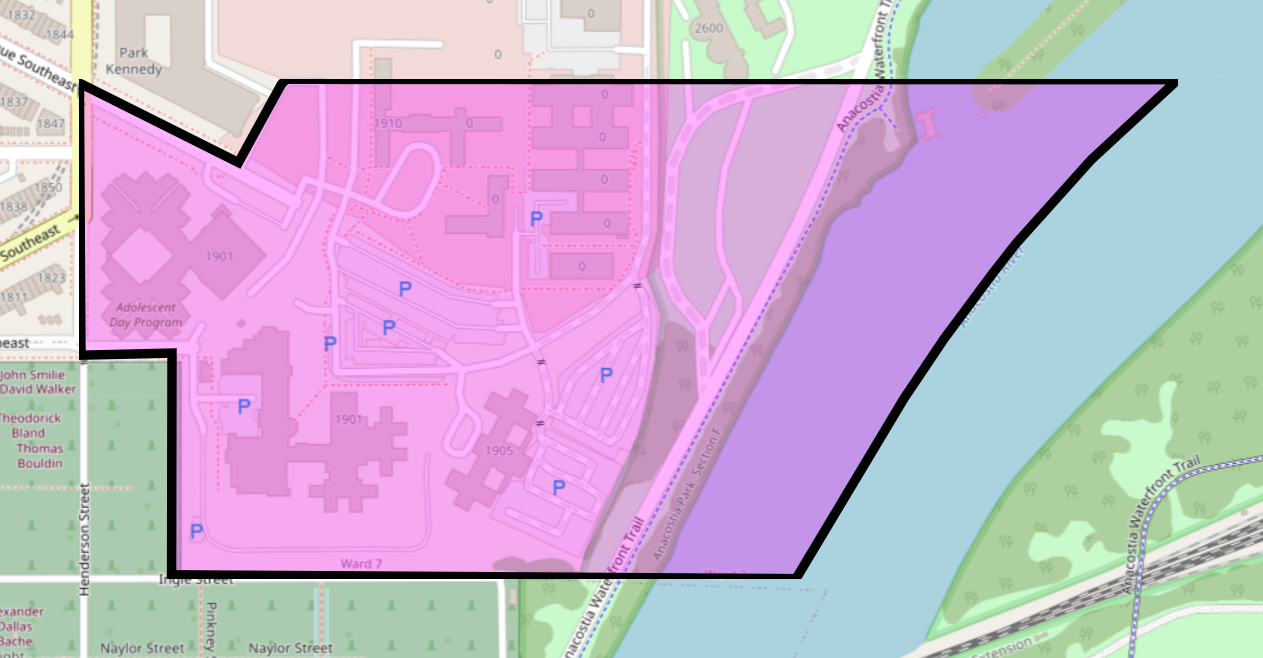
- Map of Advisory Neighborhood Commission district 7F08
- District: Hill East
- Region: Washington, D.C.
- Population: ≈ 1,700

Current constituency
- Created: 2022
- Number of members: 1
- Member: Shameka Hayes

Single-member district 7F08 of Advisory Neighborhood Commission 7F in Washington, D.C., has existed since 2023, its electorate consisting entirely of inmates of the D.C. Jail. From 2013 to 2022, the jail's residents made up a majority of district 7F07, from which 7F08 was then carved out. As of January 2025, 7F08's commissioner is Shameka Hayes.

While district 7F07 first appeared in the 2012 general election, no election was contested until 2020, partly because convicted felons—the longest-term residents of the jail, where stays typically last less than a year—could not vote and were thus barred from running for the Commission. After D.C. enfranchised all felons in 2020, several inmates ran write-in campaigns in 2020, but all failed on procedural grounds. Joel Castón, who would have won in 2020 but for a paperwork error, won a special election the next year to fill the vacancy caused by his own disqualification—the first election in American history in which both the victor and all members of the electorate were incarcerated. After receiving parole from his life sentence and moving to the one residential complex within 7F07, Castón successfully lobbied to carve out a district for just the jail, 7F08. In 2022, Leonard Bishop was elected to be the new district's first commissioner. Bishop was transferred to another facility in July 2023. Hayes, one of roughly 100 female residents of the 1,700-person district, replaced him in a special election and won a full term the next year.

== 2013–2022: District 7F07 ==
The Advisory Neighborhood Commissions (ANCs) of Washington, D.C., advise the district government on a variety of matters. Commissioners serve two-year terms. They draw no salary but receive funding for expenses and staffing. (Note: D.C. Code § 1–207.38) ANC 7F is part of Ward 7. During redistricting in 2011 after the 2010 census, the D.C. Council created district 7F07, encompassing the D.C. Jail; the D.C. General homeless shelter (since demolished); the Harriet Tubman Women's Shelter; and St. Coletta of Greater Washington, a school for students with intellectual disabilities. According to the District of Columbia Board of Elections (BOE) and Department of Corrections (DOC), inmates are eligible to serve as commissioners provided they meet residency requirements. The average stay in the jail as of 2020 is 285 days, less than the two-year term.

=== 2020 and 2021 elections ===
No candidates contested the seat from its inaugural election in 2012 through 2018. In 2020, D.C. restored felons' right to vote; since commissioners must be eligible to vote, this increased the pool of potential candidates, including those serving the longest sentences. The same year, the advocacy group Neighbors for Justice began to pressure the DOC to make inmates aware of the election and their eligibility to run in it. The DOC refused to distribute material not originating from the BOE, while the BOE refused as it was not in "the business of encouraging particular people or particular groups to run for office". The election proceeded in November 2020 without any listed candidates. Of 23 write-in votes cast, 21 went to candidates who had not signed the required affirmation of write-in candidacy, leaving only Joel Castón, who had run at the suggestion of his former professor, Marc Morjé Howard of Georgetown University's Prison Scholars Program. However, Castón was registered to vote in Ward 8 and was thus ruled ineligible. Castón, who had not lived in Ward 8 since he received a life sentence for murder 26 years prior, attributed the issue to incorrect guidance given by prison staff when he registered. Nearby ANC 6B denounced the board's decision.

Elections to fill empty seats were subsequently canceled due to COVID-19. The D.C. Council ordered the BOE to resume elections in March 2021, partly because of the 7F07 vacancy. Twenty-five signatures are required for running in a special election, and amidst a 23-hour-a-day COVID lockdown, guards circulated petitions on inmates' behalves. Castón qualified for the ballot, as did four other inmates. The DOC produced a video, later published on YouTube by Neighbors for Justice, of the candidates giving statements. The election on June 15 saw 142 votes cast, 141 of them by inmates. Castón won with 33% of the vote, making him the first incarcerated person to win an election in D.C. and marking the first election in U.S. history where both the electorate and winning candidate were incarcerated.

=== Castón's tenure ===
Castón was sworn in by Judge Milton C. Lee, wearing a suit provided by the DOC. The DOC gave Castón an office for his work as commissioner, including a computer and a landline phone. He used Zoom to conduct official business with people outside the jail, including participating in "hybrid" ANC meetings that had been established in April 2020 because of the pandemic. The program was extended in July 2021, during Castón's tenure. Neighborhood activists connected him to residents of the women's shelter and Park Kennedy, an apartment building then under development across the street. Castón was nearly transferred to a prison outside of D.C. on November 9, 2021, on the eve of planned testimony to the D.C. Council about prison conditions, but the transfer was canceled amid outcry. He was released on parole on November 22, having had his sentence reduced under D.C.'s Incarceration Reduction Amendment Act. Castón, who moved in to Park Kennedy, remained the commissioner after his release. He would later become a member of the D.C. Sentencing Commission.

== 2023–present: District 7F08 ==
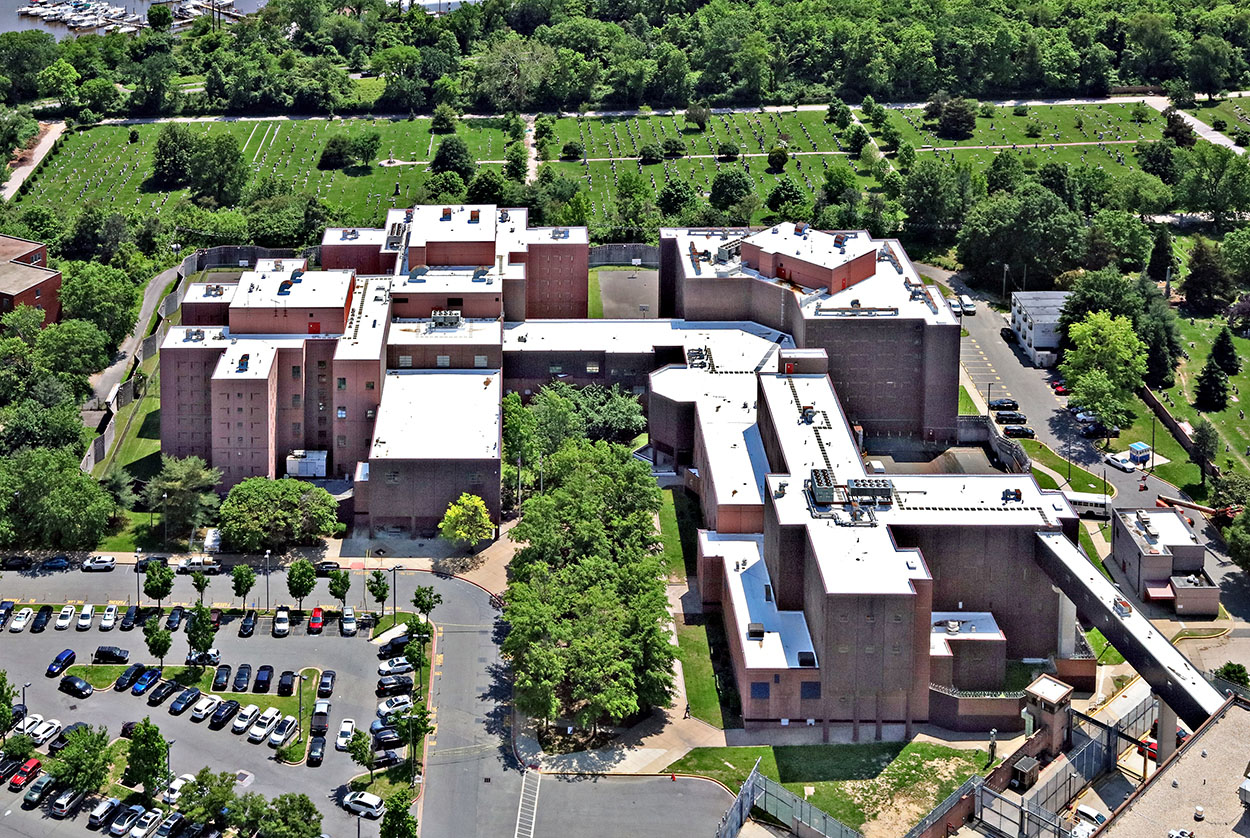
District 7F08 was carved out to exclusively represent the inmates of the D.C. Jail.

During the 2021 redistricting of the ANCs based on the 2020 census, advocates lobbied to make the D.C. Jail its own ANC district. After initial plans were drawn for such a carve-out, Council Chairman Phil Mendelson proposed to keep the jail and Park Kennedy in the same district, citing the jail's small population (1,300) compared to the average district population of 2,000. Councilmember Elissa Silverman, a member of the redistricting subcommittee, criticized Mendelson in strong terms. Castón, who had been a co-chair of the Ward 7 redistricting task force, said in a letter to the D.C. Council that "having an incarcerated resident represent the residents of the jail as ANC Commissioner is important not only because of the hope and public safety benefits it brings, but also because the residents of the jail are a vulnerable population with their own unique challenges and they cannot be adequately represented by somebody on the outside". In response, Mendelson reverted to the original plan for a standalone district for the jail, 7F08.

=== 2022 election and Bishop's tenure ===
In the November 2022 D.C. general election, 68 write-in votes were cast for seat 7F08, of which 46 were for people who had affirmed their write-in candidacy. Leonard Bishop won 12 votes, a plurality. He was sworn in on January 12, 2023, by Councilmember Brooke Pinto. Like Castón, Bishop was serving a life sentence and was at the D.C. Jail pending consideration of an IRRA motion.

Bishop, a student at Georgetown and Ashland University and a youth mentor, attended ANC meetings via Zoom and received guidance from other commissioners on procedural matters. He told the Washington City Paper that he met with Castón, who advised him, "Listen to the people, man". Bishop's chief concerns with the jail included slow mail delivery, low-quality and unhealthy food, and limits on commissary purchasing that do not adapt to inflation-borne price hikes. He also sought to increase access to vocational education for inmates. Bishop worked with alleged participants in the 2021 assault on the U.S. Capitol, whose presence in the jail had brought Congressional scrutiny into living conditions there. He told the City Paper, "Those other things they been complaining about, but we've been complaining about [them] for years. And it went ignored. The food, the conditions. I guess they just helped shed light on an ongoing situation."

Bishop, who had advocated for inmates' right to testify before the D.C. Council, was scheduled for transfer to United States Penitentiary, McCreary, a high-security prison in Kentucky where he had previously been incarcerated, shortly after he testified in favor of a proposed law to improve food at the jail. Bishop still had an actual innocence petition pending under the Innocence Protection Act. Stating his desire to serve out his two-year term on ANC 7F, he reached out to other elected officials. Sixty other commissioners sought to prevent Bishop's transfer, alongside Pinto and Eleanor Holmes Norton, D.C.'s delegate to Congress. However, he was moved on July 20, rendering him ineligible to remain a commissioner. As of December 2023, he was imprisoned at USP McCreary.

=== 2023 and 2024 elections and Hayes's tenure ===
A special election was held in December 2023 to replace Bishop, with about 100 ballots cast in the jail's branch of the D.C. Public Library. The League of Women Voters registered over 100 inmates to vote. Media were allowed to observe the election, although under strict restrictions as to access. Shameka Hayes won a special election to replace Bishop, becoming the first woman to represent the D.C. Jail. (The main facility at the D.C. Jail, the Central Detention Facility, houses only men. As a result, only around 100 of the 1,700 residents in 7F08 are women.) Hayes defeated 10 other candidates with a 25-vote plurality. Hayes, who like Howard and Bishop has attended classes at Georgetown University while in jail, was awaiting trial on drug charges; it was unclear if she would be at the D.C. Jail long enough to serve out the remainder of Bishop's term.

Hayes retained the accommodations that had been granted to Castón and Bishop. Entering her term, she cited hygiene concerns in her unit, which she said had two working showers and was failing to provide clean jumpsuits to women who were menstruating. She also criticized food and medical issues in the jail (saying she had gone from a large to a triple-extra-large clothing size while incarcerated) and gender disparities in access to education in what she called a "male-run facility". Hayes was sworn in in January with Councilmember Vincent C. Gray in attendance.

Hayes was elected to a full term in November 2024.

== Election results ==
As of January 2024, the Board of Elections' website does not include results for special elections. The results of the 2021 special election can be reconstructed from news reports, although with some details missing. News coverage of the 2023 special election does not include detailed figures, and thus no table is included below.

2020 Washington, D.C. Advisory Neighborhood Commission district 7F07 election
| Party | Candidate | Votes | % |
|---|---|---|---|
| Nonpartisan | Joel Castón (write-in) | 2 | 8.70 |
| Disqualified write-ins | | 21 | 91.30 |
| Total votes | | 23 | 100.0 |

2021 Washington, D.C. Advisory Neighborhood Commission district 7F07 special election
| Party | Candidate | Votes | % |
|---|---|---|---|
| Nonpartisan | Joel Castón (Note: Source does not say whether candidates ran as write-ins or were on the ballot.) | 48 | 33.80 |
| Nonpartisan | Kim Thompson | 31 | 21.83 |
| Nonpartisan | Gary Proctor | 23 | 16.20 |
| Nonpartisan | K. Littlepage-El | 21 | 14.79 |
| Nonpartisan | Aaron Success Brown | 19 | 13.38 |
| Total votes | | 142 (Note: Source does not say whether any disqualified write-in votes were cast.) | 100.0 |

2022 Washington, D.C. Advisory Neighborhood Commission district 7F08 election
| Party | Candidate | Votes | % |
|---|---|---|---|
| Nonpartisan | Leonard Eugene Bishop (write-in) | 12 | 17.65 |
| Nonpartisan | Seth Andrews (write-in) | 9 | 13.24 |
| Nonpartisan | Arik Adani Sims (write-in) | 5 | 7.35 |
| Nonpartisan | Aaron Brown (write-in) | 3 | 4.41 |
| Nonpartisan | E'Monnie Barnes (write-in) | 3 | 4.41 |
| Nonpartisan | Brittany Jones (write-in) | 2 | 2.94 |
| Nonpartisan | Xavier Lee (write-in) | 2 | 2.94 |
| Nonpartisan | Curtis Donnell Roach (write-in) | 2 | 2.94 |
| Nonpartisan | Rasheed Carroll (write-in) | 2 | 2.94 |
| Nonpartisan | Kim Thompson (write-in) | 1 | 1.47 |
| Nonpartisan | Philip McDaniel (write-in) | 1 | 1.47 |
| Nonpartisan | Lache Cuffey (write-in) | 1 | 1.47 |
| Nonpartisan | Lashawn Alexander (write-in) | 1 | 1.47 |
| Nonpartisan | Robert Santana (write-in) | 1 | 1.47 |
| Nonpartisan | Harold Cunningham (write-in) | 1 | 1.47 |
| Disqualified write-ins | | 22 | 32.35 |
| Total votes | | 68 | 100.0 |
