= 2022 District of Columbia elections =

- Turnout: 40.76%

On November 8, 2022, the District of Columbia held elections for several local and federal government offices. Its primary elections were held on June 21, 2022.

The District of Columbia elected its nonvoting member of the House of Representatives, its Shadow congressperson to the House of Representatives, Mayor of the District of Columbia, the Attorney General of the District of Columbia, and 6 of 13 seats on the council.

There is also one ballot measure which was voted on.

== Federal elections ==
=== United States House of Representatives ===
Eleanor Holmes Norton ran for re-election as a non-voting delegate to the House of Representatives.

2022 United States House of Representatives election in District of Columbia
Party	Candidate	Votes	%
Democratic	Eleanor Holmes Norton (incumbent)	174,238	86.54
Republican	Nelson Rimensnyder	11,701	5.81
DC Statehood Green	Natale Stracuzzi	9,867	4.90
Libertarian	Bruce Major	4,003	1.99
Write-in		1,521	0.76
Total valid votes		201,330	97.84
Rejected ballots		4,444	2.16
Total votes		205,774	100.00
Turnout			40.76

=== Shadow Representative ===
Incumbent Democrat Oye Owolewa ran for re-election.

General election results
Party	Candidate	Votes	%
Democratic	Oye Owolewa (incumbent)	151,182	83.63%
DC Statehood Green	Joyce Robinson-Paul	26,530	14.68%
Write-in		3,053	1.69%
Total votes		180,765	100.0%

== District elections ==
=== Mayor ===
2022 Washington, D.C., mayoral election
Party	Candidate	Votes	%	±%
Democratic	Muriel Bowser (incumbent)	147,433	74.62	−1.78
Independent	Rodney Grant	29,531	14.95	N/A
Republican	Stacia Hall	11,510	5.83	N/A
Libertarian	Dennis Sobin	2,521	1.28	−2.12
Write-in		6,580	3.33	-0.67
Total votes		197,575	100	
Turnout		205,774	40.76	−5.53
Registered electors		504,815		

=== Attorney General ===
2022 District of Columbia Attorney General election
Party	Candidate	Votes	%
Democratic	Brian Schwalb	177,126	97.51%
Independent	Write-in	4,516	2.49%
Total votes		181,642	100%
n/a	Overvotes	123	
n/a	Undervotes	23,647	

=== Ballot measure ===
Initiative 82, titled, An initiative to increase the minimum wage for tipped employees to the same level as non-tipped employees, aims to phase out the special minimum wage for tipped employees.

==== Result ====
Initiative 82
Choice	Votes	%
For	132,925	73.94
Against	46,861	26.06
Total	179,786	100.00
Valid votes	179,786	87.48
Invalid/blank votes	25,723	12.52
Total votes	205,509	100.00
Registered voters/turnout	504,815	40.71
Source: District of Columbia Board of Elections
