= Francesco Baglietto =

Italian physician and botanist (1826–1916)

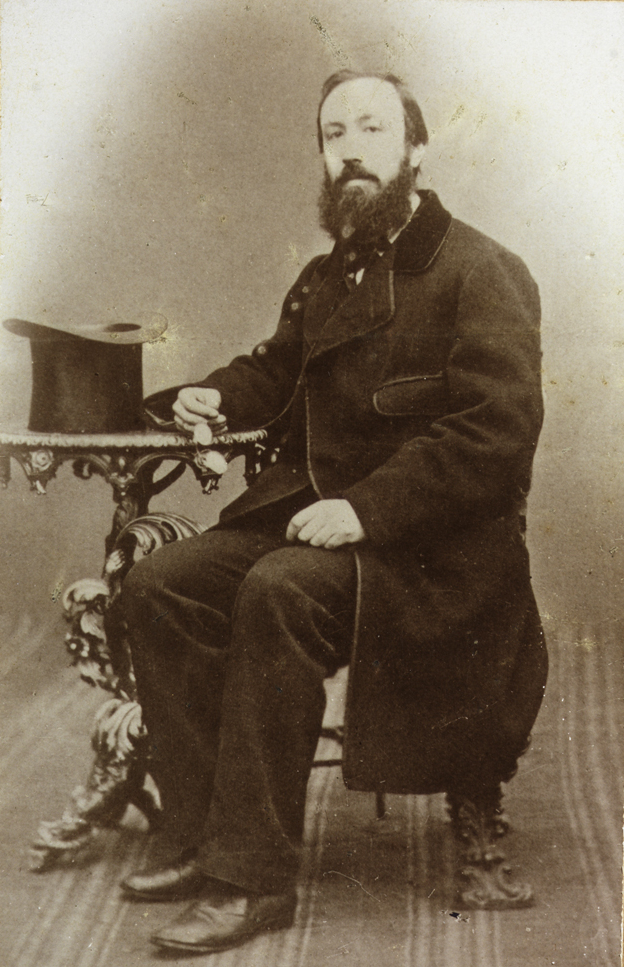
- Portrait of Francesco Baglietto in the last decade of the 19th century
- Born: 2 July 1826; Voltri
- Died: 24 February 1916 (aged 89); Genoa
- Scientific career
- Fields: Lichenology
- Author abbrev. (botany): Bagl.

Francesco Baglietto (2 September 1826 – 24 February 1916) was an Italian physician and botanist, known for his studies on cryptogams, particularly on lichens.

== Biography ==
Francesco Baglietto (2 September 1816 – 24 February 1916) was an Italian botanist and lichenologist born in Voltri, Italy. Under the tutelage of Giuseppe De Notaris, he developed expertise in lichenology, producing numerous influential publications on the subject.

Baglietto, along with de Notaris and Vincenzo de Cesati, established the Società crittogamologica italiana (Italian Cryptogamic Society). The society published the journal Commentario della Società crittogamologica italiana ("Commentary of the Italian Cryptogamic Society") and aimed to create a comprehensive Italian cryptogamic herbarium encompassing mosses, lichens, ferns, and mushrooms.

In collaboration with de Cesati and de Notaris, Baglietto published two series of the exsiccata work Erbario crittogamico Italiano. This collection comprised 3000 numbered specimens distributed in an unknown number of sets. The first series was organized into "volumes" across 30 issues, while the second series was divided into two parts, with one part containing 10 issues.

In 1871, Baglietto published Prospetto lichenologico della Toscana, a comprehensive work that combined previous lichenological research with material from private collections, documenting 411 lichen species from Tuscany and its neighboring islands. His personal lichen herbarium was later purchased by Giovanni Battista de Toni (1864–1925) for £2000 and is now housed at the Botanical Institute of Modena. Additional portions of his collection are preserved at the Natural History Museum in Genoa. His cryptogam collection is regarded as one of Europe's most significant of its kind.

One of the people who learnt about lichens from him was the priest G. Gresino (1859-1946) who later passed on knowledge to Camillo Sbarbaro, so providing some continuity in the study of lichenology in Italy.

Baglietto died in Genoa on 24 February 1916. His contributions to lichenology are commemorated in three lichen genera: Bagliettoa A.Massal. (1853), Parabagliettoa Gueidan & Cl.Roux (2009), and Protobagliettoa Servít (1955).

== Selected publications ==
- Baglietto, F. (1857). "Enumerazione dei licheni di Liguria" [Enumeration of lichens of Liguria]. Memorie della Accademia delle Scienze di Torino. 2 (in Italian). 17: 373–415.
- Baglietto, F. (1861). "Nuove specie di licheni" [New species of lichen]. Commentario della Società Crittogamologica Italiana. 1 (1): 17–24.
- Baglietto, F. (1865). "Materiali per la micologia Italiana" [Materials for Italian mycology]. Commentario della Società Crittogamologica Italiana. 2 (2): 261–265.
- Baglietto, F. (1870). "Nota sull'Endocarpon guepini Delise e descrizione della Guepinella myriocarpa n.sp" [Note on Endocarpon guepini Delise and description of Guepinella myriocarpa n.sp.]. Nuovo Giornale Botanico Italiano. 2: 171–174.
- Baglietto, F. (1871). "Prospetto Lichenologico della Toscana" [Lichenological prospects of Tuscany]. Nuovo Giornale Botanico Italiano (in Italian). 3: 211–297.
- Baglietto, F. (1879). "Lichenes insulae Sardiniae". Nuovo Giornale Botanico Italiano (in Latin). 11 (1): 50–123.

== See also ==
- Category:Taxa named by Francesco Baglietto
