= Antonio Nardello =

Executed Italian serial killer

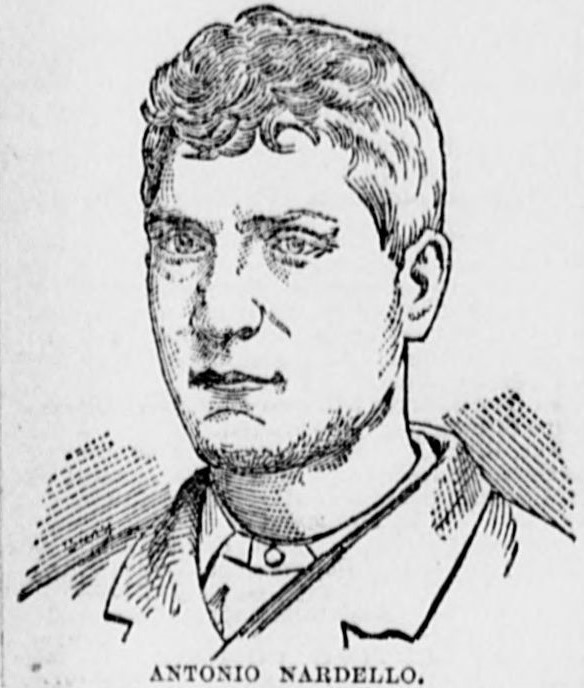
- Court sketch of Nardello
- Born: 1864; Naples, Italy
- Died: May 28, 1886 (aged 21–22); D.C. Jail, Washington, D.C., U.S.
- Other names: Frank Rosso; Michael Ross
- Status: Executed by hanging
- Conviction: First degree murder
- Penalty: Death

Details
- Victims: 3
- Span of crimes: 1884–1885
- Country: United States
- States: Maryland and Washington D.C.
- Date apprehended: July 29, 1886

Antonio Nardello (1864 – May 28, 1886) was an Italian serial killer who, during his employment as a laborer, robbed and murdered three other laborers in Maryland and Washington, D.C., between 1884 and 1885. Convicted of one murder, he was sentenced to death and subsequently executed in 1886.

== Early life ==
Antonio Nardello was born in Naples, Italy. At the time of his birth, his father was imprisoned for twenty years for brigandage, and Nardello never saw him. In 1883, he emigrated to the United States, working at various times in New York, Chicago, and finally in Cecil County, Maryland, where he was employed as a laborer by the Baltimore and Ohio Railroad.

== Murders ==
=== Brosnan ===
On April 1, 1884, aiming to rob a fellow laborer along the Philadelphia Road in Gunpowder, Maryland, Nardello killed a man named Brosnan, known by his nickname "The Blacksmith". Another employee, Juliano, was erroneously convicted of the crime and sentenced to ten years imprisonment. He was exonerated only after Nardello confessed to the crime shortly before his execution two years later.

=== Antonio de Balbo ===
On May 19, 1885, a laborer named Charles Bushel was searching for a stray cow near his Cecil County homestead when he accidentally discovered the body of a man on a hill, partially covered with leaves and hidden in a bush. The right side of his skull had been crushed, and judging by the advanced state of decay of the flesh on his face and hands, he had been murdered upwards of months prior. No valuables were found on the body, only a ticket from the Philadelphia, Wilmington and Baltimore Railroad line between Wilmington, Delaware, and Chester, Pennsylvania, and a letter written in Italian, dated November 1, 1884, and addressed to a man named Antonio Sibbini. An autopsy of the body concluded that he had died from blunt force trauma, likely inflicted with a club or cane, but no positive identification of the deceased could be ascertained. It was speculated that the victim had been an employee of the Baltimore and Ohio Railroad, and when the authorities questioned the workers, they claimed most of them suspected a fellow countryman, one Antonio Nardello, might've been the killer, but he had left for Baltimore in December 1884. With no clues leading to the identity of either victim or killer, the deceased's remains were buried, and the case faded into obscurity.

The truth was revealed on the day of Nardello's execution, when he confessed to the murder of a fellow railroad worker, Antonio de Balbo. In his testimony, he had boarded at the victim's home and knew that de Balbo had cash on him, and on December 19, 1884, he asked him to accompany him on a walk. While de Balbo was distracted, Nardello pulled out a gun and shot him, taking his watch and money, which he later sold in Baltimore, before concealing the body in the bushes. Although there were discrepancies in his confession, key among them being that de Balbo had been shot instead of bludgeoned to death, the authorities still considered his confession credible based on the circumstances and officially closed the case.

=== Carmine Rotunno ===
On August 1, 1885, citizens living close to a newly built reservoir near Howard University in Washington, D.C., lodged complaints about a foul smell emanating from an old, abandoned shack on the farm of Curtis Gilbert. When they entered one of the rooms on the second floor, they discovered the decomposing body of a man lying on the floor. At his glance, nothing suspicious about his death was noted until the officers noticed the huge gash on his neck, as well as blood splattered on the floor and walls. Not long after, the decedent was identified as a middle-aged Italian immigrant named Carmine Rotunno, a laborer and shoemaker who lived at a nearby boarding house. He was last seen on the early morning of July 29, accompanied by one Antonio Nardello, another laborer with a reputation for being a lazy man who preferred to spend his money and time gambling. Despite warnings from his co-workers, Rotunno accompanied Nardello, as the latter had promised him work, and was never seen alive again.

== Arrest, trial, and execution ==
The very same day, authorities tracked down Nardello to a house on Maryland Avenue, where he had been staying with a woman named Willa Morrow, under the pseudonym Frank Rosso. Both were arrested at the Baltimore and Potomac Depot, where they were due to catch a train to Baltimore. When examining the room occupied by Morrow, police found bloodied clothing, which they ascertained belonged to Nardello. Due to him violently resisting arrest and threatening suicide, he was shackled and sent off to jail. In the subsequent interviews, he admitted that he had participated in the murder and that a bloody razor found at the scene belonged to him but claimed to have had two accomplices: Pasquale Gesimonte and Pasquale Aboudante. According to Nardello, the trio lured Rotunno to the house, with him and Gesimonte holding the victim down while Aboudante cut his throat. They then stole $150 from his pockets, of which Nardello received a meager $30. No evidence implicating the two men could be found, and soon, Nardello was put on trial for the murder of Rotunno.

On October 10, 1885, Nardello was officially indicted for Rotunno's murder, with Col. Frank Mancossis sworn in as his interpreter, as Nardello couldn't speak or understand English well. Initially, due to the news spreading about the crime, the court had difficulty picking out juries, as a majority of them had formed an opinion based on what they read from the newspapers. During the trial, one of Nardello's attorneys, Col. Corkhill, received a letter of gratitude from Italian minister Baron Saverio Fava for defending Nardello.

After the trial resumed, more than 200 witnesses were brought to testify at the trial, chief among them being Carmine Gaudio, at whose house Rotunno had lodged in. In his translated testimony, he noted that Rotunno had visited him several times on the day of his disappearance to buy beer, and although he hadn't seen Nardello, he knew that the blood-stained pants found at Morrow's house were his. Antonio continued to insist that he was simply an accomplice in the murder, knowing fully well that he would be hung, but demanded that Gesimonte and Aboudante be executed as well. Disregarding his wishes, on December 12, 1885, Nardello was found guilty of the murder and sentenced to death. Initially appearing unfazed, he wept bitterly on his way to jail.

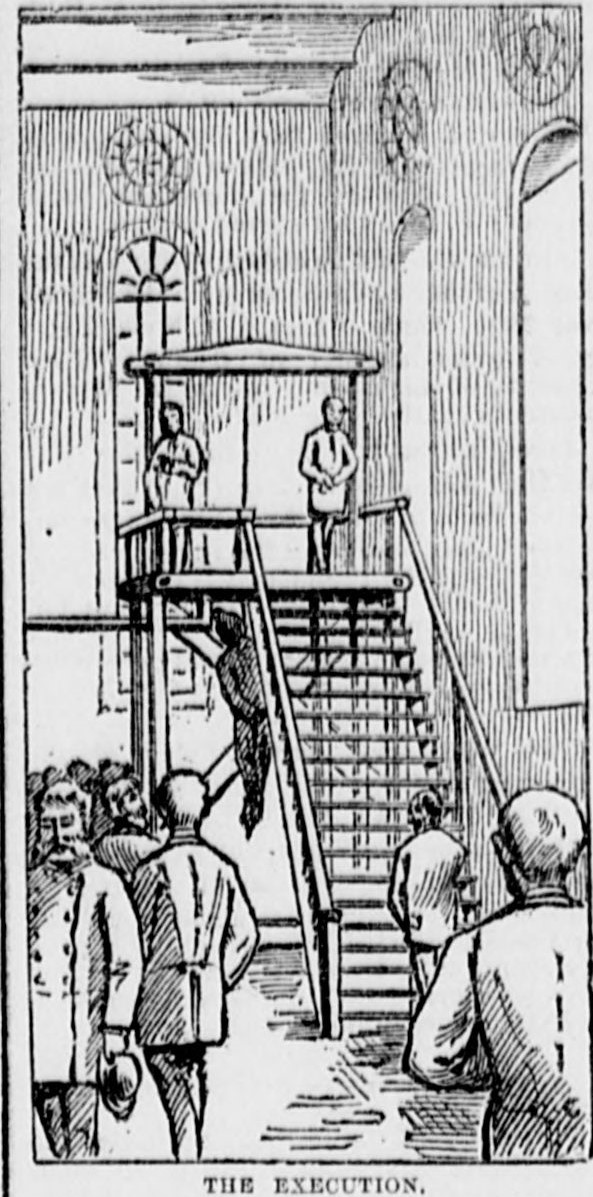
Nardello's execution

About a month after the sentencing, his attorneys filed a motion for a new trial, citing new evidence that would prove that their client was innocent. They had received a letter from a friend of Nardello who claimed he could provide witnesses that would indicate where Nardello was and even named them, but in the end, the motion was denied. While residing on death row, Nardello turned towards religion and wrote letters to newspapers in his home country, as well as sending copies of his photographs to relatives in Italy. Much to his pleasant surprise, on May 5, he was granted a three-week reprieve by President Grover Cleveland, but after it passed, Nardello was informed that his sentence wouldn't be commuted and the execution would proceed as planned.

The day before his execution, Nardello confessed to his priests that he had murdered Rotunno and the two men in Maryland. After explaining in detail what he had done, he walked to the scaffold, uttering prayers loudly in Italian and reaffirming his innocence. The gallows trap door was sprung at 1:30 pm, and Nardello hanged for eight minutes before officials lowered his body, although he still had a pulse; after fifteen and one half minutes, his pulse ceased, and he was pronounced dead.

== See also ==
- List of serial killers in the United States
