= Capital punishment in the District of Columbia =

Capital punishment is abolished in the District of Columbia. However, a number of executions were carried out under the District's jurisdiction before abolition. These executions should be distinguished from cases such as the 1942 execution of the six Nazi saboteurs which took place in the District, but under the jurisdiction of the federal government.

== History ==
Before 1973, the District of Columbia was exclusively governed by the United States Congress, which included establishing all local laws. Until 1962, the District of Columbia was the last jurisdiction in the United States with mandatory death sentences for first-degree murder (the last state with mandatory death sentences for first degree murder was Vermont). Mandatory death sentences were abolished by the HR5143 (PL87-423), signed into law by President John F. Kennedy on March 22, 1962. Rape was also a capital offense.

The D.C. capital punishment law was nullified by the Supreme Court decision in Furman v. Georgia in 1972 and formally repealed by the D.C. Council in 1981. In the 1992 Congress-ordered referendum, District residents voted against reinstating the death penalty by a 2-1 margin. That death penalty would not have been banned for juvenile offenders and the intellectually disabled was a factor in its failure. In 1997, Mayor Marion Barry proposed a bill allowing capital punishment for the murder of public safety employees, which was rejected by the council's Judiciary Committee.

The first recorded execution in District of Columbia was the hanging of James McGirk in 1802. The District moved its executions to the newly constructed D.C. Jail in 1872. Hanging was the method of execution used in the District until 1928, when it was replaced with electrocution. Executions were conducted at the far end of the jail's dining hall until an official execution chamber was constructed in 1940. The last execution under the authority of the District took place in 1957, when Robert Carter was executed.

The President of the United States has sole pardoning power in the District.

Following President Donald Trump's August 2025 federal takeover of D.C. police, he said federal prosecutors would seek the death penalty for every homicide case in the District.

== See also ==
- List of people executed by the District of Columbia
- Crime in Washington, D.C.
- Government of the District of Columbia
