= D.C. Jail =

Jail in Washington, D.C.

District of Columbia Jail
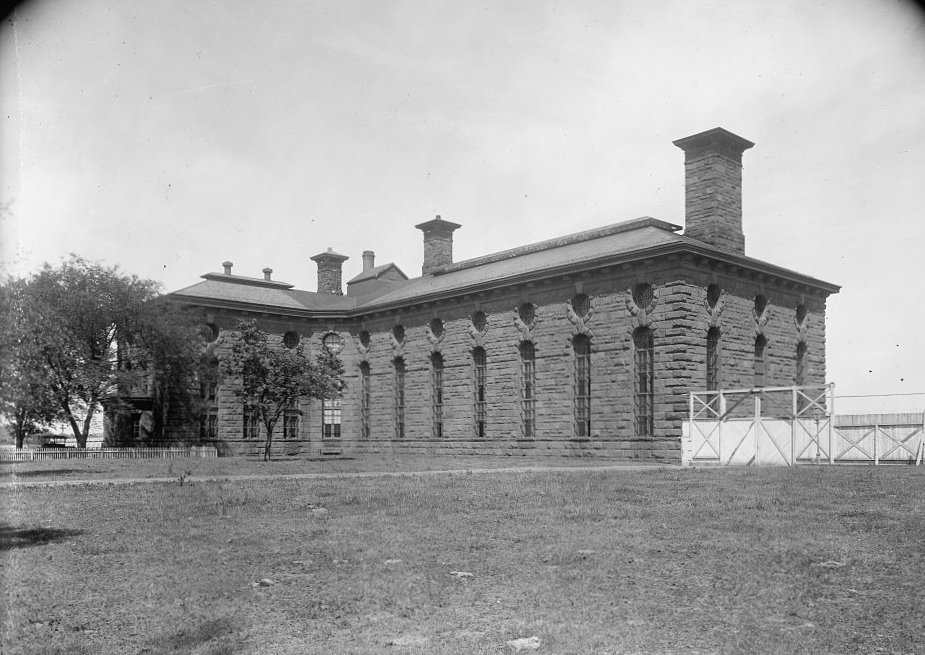
- The original jail building circa 1910
- Interactive map of District of Columbia Jail
- Location: Washington, D.C.; 38.8834°N 76.9763°W
- Status: Operational
- Capacity: 2,164
- Opened: 1872
- Managed by: District of Columbia Department of Corrections; Federal Bureau of Prisons

The District of Columbia Jail or the D.C. Central Detention Facility (commonly referred to as the D.C. Jail) is a jail run by the District of Columbia Department of Corrections in the Hill East neighborhood of Washington, D.C., U.S. The majority of male inmates housed in the Central Detention Facility are awaiting adjudication of cases or are sentenced for misdemeanor offenses. Female inmates in the custody of the D.C. Department of Corrections are housed at the adjacent Correctional Treatment Facility. After the National Capital Revitalization and Self-Government Improvement Act of 1997, sentenced felons are transferred to the Federal Bureau of Prisons.

== History ==
The current building was constructed in 1976. It replaced a jail built in 1872. In turn, this building replaced a federal penitentiary that had been torn down at the US Army Arsenal a few years earlier.

The jail also housed D.C.'s execution chamber from its construction in 1872 to 1957. 104 prisoners, all men, were executed at the jail, 54 by hanging and 50 by electrocution. The far end of the jail's dining hall was used as an execution chamber until officials constructed a formal windowless execution chamber on the top floor of the facility in 1940. Six German spies convicted of sabotage, including Richard Quirin and Herbert Hans Haupt, were tried in a military court, found guilty, and electrocuted here in August 1942 less than one week after their convictions, during World War II.

== Programs ==
As of 2004, a group called the "Free Minds Book Club & Writing Workshop," came into the jail twice a week, which allowed inmates to read and write. The jail offers "HIV/ AIDS Prevention, Education and Intervention Services; Individual and Group Counseling Services; Hispanic Life Skills; Book Club; Street Law; Literacy Education; Religious Services; Mental Health Adjustment; and Anger Management, among other life skills development and religious services."

== Conditions ==
In August 1995, the Jail's medical care facility was placed under court-ordered receivership, after the District was held in contempt for repeatedly failing to implement court orders...intended to ensure adequate medical services to jail inmates". The receivership ended in September 2000.

In 2010, a long-time inmate of the D.C. Jail claimed that nine years in the D.C. Jail was equivalent to 20 years in another prison. The inmate told of moldy jail cells, questionable strip searches, broken locks on cell doors, staph infections, rodents and violent assaults. US District Judge Thomas Hogan called the conditions at the jail "a shame."

In 2013, a report noted that 165 people had attempted suicide over roughly a two-year period and four had actually committed suicide during that same time. There were three suicides over the period of two months. An HIV-positive deaf man sued the D.C. Jail, claiming he was denied medical care and was retaliated against for complaining about jail conditions.

In 2014, there was debate over health care provider services at the jail.

In 2015, a report from the Washington Lawyers' Committee called the conditions at the jail "alarming," noting that structures were deteriorating and that drug addicts detained there need additional resources. The report recommended that the facility be replaced. The report criticized anti-suicide initiatives by the department. Mayor Muriel Bowser announced that the jail would reintroduce face-to-face visits between inmates and their relatives. Face-to-face visits were eliminated in 2012 when the jail made video conferencing the policy. The Economist reported that the jail houses people with serious mental illness for minor offenses.

== Notable incidents ==
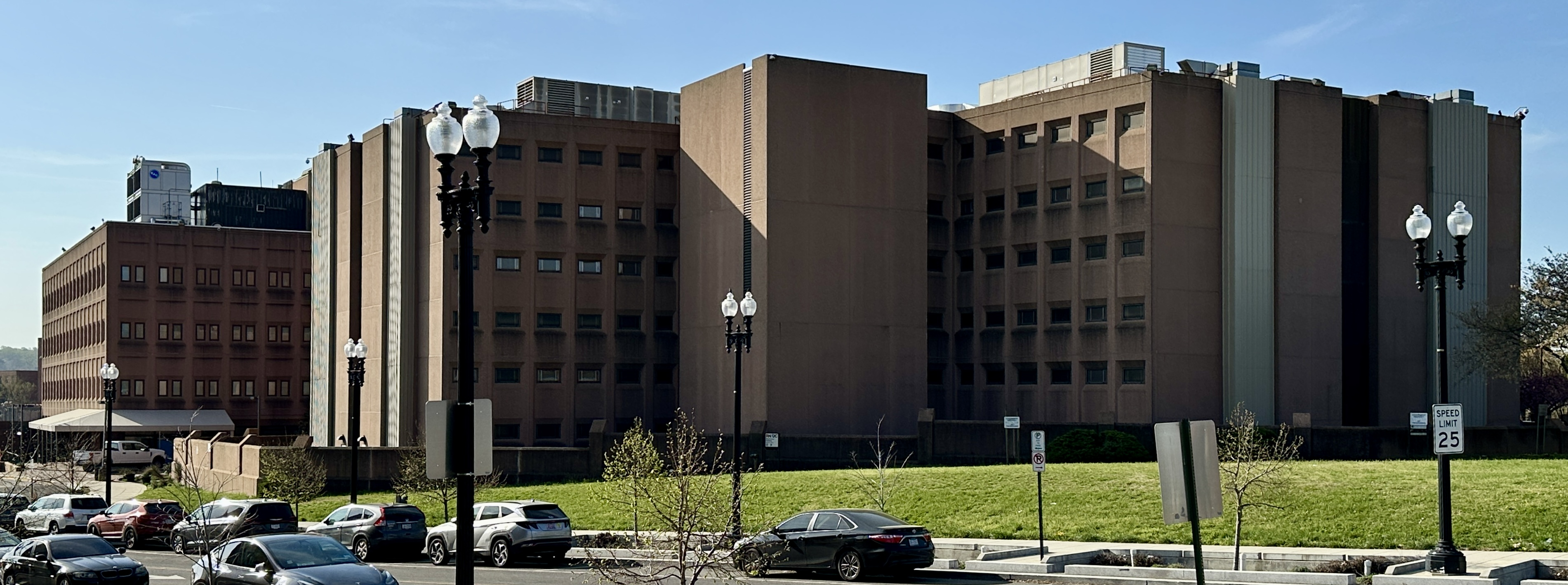
DC Central Detention Facility in 2026

On October 11, 1972, a year after the Attica Prison Uprising, the D.C. Jail held approximately 1,100 prisoners (double its capacity) and at least 36 of those residents took 9 guards hostage in order to bargain for their freedom. Wielding a loaded pistol, the residents demanded William Claiborne, a reporter with The Washington Post, as a negotiator. Residents were quoted as saying, "This is not a riot, it’s a revolution;" "We’re treated like animals, and we want out;" and, "We’re dead now, we’re better dying out there than in here." Despite threats of violence and the display of a guard's bloody shirt, the incident ended without further injury. Negotiations yielded the residents an opportunity to voice their grievances to a federal judge. After hearing testimony, Judge William B. Bryant required juveniles to be separated from the adult population (in opposition to President Nixon's District of Columbia Court Reform and Criminal Procedure Act of 1970) and Corrections Director Kenneth L. Hardy promised residents, "no reprisals of any kind (or) court action against any inmate." A year later, however, nine residents were convicted on charges related to the uprising.

In 2001, several middle school students underwent a strip search during a tour of the jail. Warden Patricia Britton was subsequently fired for allegedly allowing the searches.

In 2004, Jonathan Magbie died at the D.C. Jail. Magbie was paralyzed from the neck down after being struck by a drunk driver at the age of four. He was charged with marijuana possession after police found a marijuana cigarette and a loaded gun in the vehicle in which he was stopped. Although he had never been convicted of a criminal offense and although he required private nursing care for as much as 20 hours a day, Magbie was given a ten-day sentence in the D.C. jail in September 2004 by D.C. Superior Court Judge Judith E. Retchin. Lacking a ventilator, he died in city custody four days later. This provoked a series of op-ed pieces in The Washington Post by columnist Colbert I. King. Magbie's mother, with the help of the ACLU, filed a lawsuit accusing the District government and Greater Southeast Community Hospital of failing to give him proper care. The lawsuit was settled out of court.

In 2010, it was reported that there were six stabbings over the course of several months.

In 2012, a man with a history of mental illness hanged himself at the jail.

In 2013, the District of Columbia agreed to pay $6.2 million to settle allegations that the city had a practice of holding inmates at the D.C. Jail past their release date and of wrongfully strip searching inmates who were supposed to be released. In a related case in federal court, a jury found that inmates were unconstitutionally overdetained at the D.C. Jail between 2007 and 2008, but that the government wasn't liable because they didn't find evidence of "deliberate indifference" to the inmates' rights. A corrections officer at the D.C. Jail was arrested for having marijuana in his locker at the jail after a police dog detected the presence of the drug.

In 2014, a retired officer at the D.C. Jail sued the department of corrections for the right to carry guns after he reported receiving threats from inmates that he supervised. A former D.C. Jail inmate sued the city for being ordered to clean up a cell after a suicide.

In 2015, the wife of a man who committed suicide at the jail filed a lawsuit against D.C. Mayor Muriel Bowser and the D.C. Department of Corrections for wrongful death.

== Representation ==
The D.C. Jail was made part of Advisory Neighborhood Commission (ANC) district 7F07 in 2011. However, with felons barred from voting and by extension from running for the seat, it was uncontested until 2020, when D.C. restored felons' voting rights. After being procedurally disqualified in 2020, inmate Joel Castón was elected in 2021, making him the first incarcerated person to win an election in D.C. and marking the first election in U.S. history where both the electorate and winning candidate were incarcerated. The jail was moved into its own carved-out district, 7F08, in 2021. The Department of Corrections has provided Castón and his successors with access to office space, a computer, and a landline telephone, and has provided professional attire for swearings-in. Commissioners attend ANC meetings via Zoom.

The district's commissioners have advocated for prisoners' rights in matters including slow mail delivery, low-quality and unhealthy food, limits on commissary purchasing that do not adapt to inflation-borne price hikes, hygiene (general and menstrual), healthcare quality, and gender disparities in access to education. On two occasions, sudden plans for a commissioner's transfer out of the jail (which would force their removal from office) have led to criticism. When Castón was scheduled for transfer on November 9, 2021, on the eve of planned testimony to the D.C. Council about prison conditions, resulting outcry led to a reversal by the department. In July 2023, 60 ANC members and multiple high-ranking D.C. officials attempted to prevent the transfer of Castón's successor Leonard Bishop, who had recently testified in favor of a proposed law to improve food at the jail, but were unsuccessful. Bishop was replaced by Shameka Hayes—one of only about 100 women among the district and jail's 1,700 residents—in a special election later that year.

== Demographics ==
The Average Daily Population (ADP) for both the Correctional Detention Facility (CDF) and the whole Department of Corrections (DOC) system are shown in the table below, grouped by calendar year.

Average Daily Population
| Year | CDF ADP | DOC ADP |
|---|---|---|
| 2018 | 1,277 | 2,033 |
| 2019 | 1,260 | 1,796 |
| 2020 | 1,034 | 1,489 |
| 2021 | 1,059 | 1,489 |
| 2022 | 998 | 1,356 |
| 2023 | 1,020 | 1,412 |
| 2024 | 1,346 | 1,923 |

As of April 2025, about 93% of residents were men and 7% were women. About 89.2% of residents in the Department of Corrections were Black (compared to 45% in D.C. overall), 4.5% were Hispanic, and 4.1% were white.
