= Joseph Eisele =

Executed German serial killer

- Born: c. 1834; Grand Duchy of Baden, German Confederation
- Died: March 6, 1868 (aged 33–34); Parkersburg, West Virginia, U.S.
- Cause of death: Execution by hanging
- Other names: "The Parkersburg Murderer"; John Schaefer
- Convictions: Murder (3 counts); Maiming with intent to kill
- Penalty: Death

Details
- Victims: 3
- Span of crimes: June – December 1867
- Country: United States
- State: West Virginia
- Date apprehended: January 6, 1868

Joseph Eisele (c. 1834 – March 6, 1868), known as The Parkersburg Murderer, was a German serial killer who robbed and murdered three fellow immigrants in Parkersburg and Wheeling, West Virginia, from June to December 1867. After a failed attempt on a would-be fourth victim, Eisele was arrested and linked to the previous crimes, to which he subsequently admitted in a written confession published after his hanging in 1868.

== Early life ==
Little is known about Eisele's life. According to his written confession, he was born in the Grand Duchy of Baden in about 1834 and served two years in the Papal Army, spending one year in Rome. After that, he deserted and fled to the mountains, a common tactic used by deserters at the time. He emigrated to the USA circa 1864, settling in Parkersburg and marrying a woman there two years after his arrival. He often worked as either a carpenter or woodworker, but was considered to be mediocre at his job, preferring to spend his time at saloons, amassing massive debts in the process.

== Murders ==
On June 5, 1867, Eisele went to a saloon on Market Street he often frequented, which was run by a fellow German emigre named Joseph Lillenthal. After assuring that they were alone, he grabbed a hatchet and started hitting Lillenthal, fracturing and severing parts of his skull. After killing him, Eisele proceeded to slash the dead man's throat, severing the arteries, before finally chopping up his spinal column. He then rummaged through the saloon, stealing any cash that he could find, with which he later paid off some of his debts. In the meantime, when Lillenthal's body was discovered, the sheer brutality of it sent the city into a panic, with an innocent black man named Taylor being falsely imprisoned for the crime, but eventually released due to lack of evidence.

Unable to find work, and again in need of money, Eisele soon contacted another German merchant, Aloys Ulrich, offering him a lucrative business opportunity in Wheeling. In the early morning of June 29, after reaching a stone culvert along the Hempfield Railroad, Eisele pulled out his hatchet and started viciously hacking at his companion, decapitating him in the process. After rifling through Ulrich's pockets, he stole $75 and a watch, left the crime scene and went to the Pemberton House to pawn off the watch, but keeping the chain that came with it. Ulrich's body was found several days after the murder, but due to decomposition, coroners were unable to identify the deceased or the exact murder weapon used in the killing. Nevertheless, after finding a case of saddler's needles and a ticket for the steamer Express, authorities narrowed down the decedent's possible identities to two men: basket-weaver John Andrews, who had vanished from Wheeling two weeks prior, or the German merchant Aloys Ulrich. In the end, it was deduced that it was indeed Ulrich, as a postage stamp and a note written from his brother Klemenz inside his pockets.

Serial killer Thomas D. Carr later claimed to have met Eisele and been an accomplice to the murder of Aloys Ulrich.

For the next six months, Eisele is not known to have committed any further violent crimes. That changed on December 6, when, after amassing debts to a Dr. Koch, who had treated him, he wanted to find a new victim. Thusly, he befriended Rudolph Tsutor, a Hungarian horse trader who had just recently sold a horse to a man in Parkersburg. After allowing his new friend to visit his rented apartment near the railroad depot, Eisele took out his hatchet and hit Tsutor on the back of the head, killing him in one blow. Eisele then took a cotton glove and shoved in the victim's mouth, before proceeding to crush Tsutor's temple and then slash his throat from ear to ear, severing several major blood vessels in the process. After assuring he was dead, he stole $75 from Tsutor and went to pay off his debts.

== Attempted murder and arrest ==
On January 6, 1868, Eisele, presenting himself as "John Schaefer", went to pay another debt he owed to coal merchant John White, who also lived in Parkersburg. He asked for a receipt, and when White turned his back to go to his desk and write one, Eisele got his hatchet and immediately swung towards his would-be victim's head. However, White unknowingly moved at the last second, with the blow landing on his shoulder instead. Realizing that he is under attack, White shouted "Murder!", a cry heard by several men who quickly ran to his aid. Eisele ditched his hatchet and attempted to flee, but was captured by police and brought into custody not long after. After examining his belongings, authorities found a cotton glove and a towel, which he likely planned to stuff inside his next victim's mouth, as well as several items identified as belonging to Ulrich and Tsutor. After initially remaining stern and silent about the murders, Eisele eventually caved in and confessed to them in the presence of a Catholic priest and several other witnesses, later producing a written confession as well.

== Trial, sentence and execution ==
Following the announcement of Eisele's arrest, he was placed in protective custody, as a large crowd of angered citizens gathered outside the jail, threatening to lynch him. His trial took place two weeks later, at which Eisele pleaded guilty to all charges and presented his written confession before the grand jury. In the confession, written in German and read aloud via an interpreter, Eisele expressed remorse for his crimes and asked for forgiveness from both his German and American countrymen, as well as emphasizing that his wife did not know of his evil deeds and that people continue practising religion to avoid becoming like him. During the rest of the proceedings, Eisele appeared calm and unmoved by his circumstances, responding in quiet 'No's or simply shaking his head when asked a question. He was found guilty and sentenced to death, and when the presiding grand jury read out the verdict detailing his crimes, the speaker also remarked how tragic it was that an educated man like Eisele had chosen such a dark path.

On March 6, 1868, Joseph Eisele was publicly hanged in a field outside Parkersburg. The event was supposedly attended by upwards of 5,000 people, due to which he had to be escorted to the gallows by a squadron of militia.

== See also ==
- Capital punishment in West Virginia
- List of people executed in West Virginia
- List of serial killers in the United States

== Bibliography ==
- Joseph Eisele (January 1, 1978). Life and crimes of Joseph Eisele, alias John Schafer, The Parkersburg Murderer. Hildegard Armbruster. ASIN B0061I27JM.
- Daniel Allen Hearn (July 4, 2015). Legal Executions in Delaware, the District of Columbia, Maryland, Virginia and West Virginia: A Comprehensive Registry, 1866-1962. McFarland. p. 149. ISBN 978-1476618258.
