= List of people executed in West Virginia =

The following is a list of people executed by the U.S. state of West Virginia. Capital punishment in West Virginia was abolished in 1965.

== 1788–1863 ==
The following executions, all by hanging, took place in the counties that now constitute West Virginia prior to their separation from the state of Virginia.

Slave executions

Name	Race	Age	Sex	Date of execution	County	Crime	Victim(s)	Governor
Charles Donaldson	White		M	June 19, 1797	Monongalia	Murder	William Donaldson, white (son)	James Wood
Millay	Black		F	September 1, 1798	Monongalia	Arson	David Robs, white (owner) (Note: Also poisoned William Robs Jr.)	James Wood
Aaron	Black		M	April 5, 1799	Hampshire	Horse stealing		James Wood
Jerry Hamilton	White		M	July 12, 1799	Hardy	Rape	Tacey Brady, white (Note: Serial rapist, raped two other women and murdered one of them.)	James Wood
Jack Neal	Black		M	January 7, 1803	Kanawha	Murder	Bennett Rogers (owner) and Ralph Elliotts, white	John Page
James	Black		M	July 30, 1803	Jefferson	Rape	Elizabeth and Elizabeth Perception Jr., white	John Page
Abram	Black		M	December 17, 1803	Kanawha	Murder	James Howard, white (owner) (Note: Abram was later believed to be innocent of the crime.)	John Page
Isaac	Black		M	December 17, 1803	Kanawha	Murder	James Howard, white (owner)	John Page
Jerry	Black		M	July 5, 1805	Berkeley	Highway robbery	David Horn, white	John Page
John	Black		M	July 5, 1805	Berkeley	Highway robbery	David Horn, white	John Page
Abel Clemmons	White		M	June 30, 1806	Monongalia	Murder	Nine people, white (Note: His wife Barbara Carpenter Clemmons and their eight children: Elijah, Hester, Rachel, Mary, Elizabeth, Benjamin, Parthense, and Ann.)	William H. Cabell
Moses	Black		M	March 29, 1811	Monroe	Murder	Will, black	James Monroe
Thomas Queen	White		M	June 11, 1813	Harrison	Murder	Female, white (cousin)	James Barbour
Jane Tygart	White	70+	F	November 18, 1814	Monroe	Murder	Male, white (husband)	James Barbour
Jim	Black		M	February 12, 1818	Hampshire	Highway robbery	James Little, white	James Patton Preston
Ellis	Black		M	November 17, 1820	Tyler	Murder	Patrick Wilson, white (owner)	Thomas Mann Randolph Jr.
Nathan	Black		M	May 1, 1821	Tyler	Murder	Patrick Wilson, white (owner)	Thomas Mann Randolph Jr.
Jack	Black		M	December 26, 1822	Wood	Rape (Note: "Carnal knowledge".)	Barbara Carpenter, 6, white	James Pleasants
Tom	Black	17	M	March 13, 1824	Greenbrier	Murder	James Newton, white (owner)	James Pleasants
Rebecca	Black	12	F	July 2, 1825	Monroe	Murder	Adeline Coalter, 4, white	James Pleasants
Joshua	Black		M	August 17, 1827	Monongalia	Rape	Tilpha Collins, white	William Branch Giles
Ebenezer Cox	White		M	August 27, 1830	Jefferson	Murder	Col. T. B. Dunn, white	John Floyd
Lucy	Black		F	September 28, 1832	Tyler	Murder	Mary Ann Fletcher, white	John Floyd
Thomas Wintringer	White		M	July 22, 1836	Ohio	Murder	Jesse Chrismann, white	Wyndham Robertson
Ned	Black		M	September 9, 1836	Preston	Murder	James Marston, white (owner)	Wyndham Robertson
Boon Long	White		M	September 23, 1836	Ohio	Murder	Jesse Chrismann, white	Wyndham Robertson
Harry	Black		M	January 12, 1838	Hampshire	Rape		David Campbell
John	Black		M	February 26, 1841	Berkeley	Murder		Thomas Walker Gilmer
William Hudson	White		M	December 18, 1846	Pendleton	Murder	Six people, white (Note: His wife, their three children, her sister-in-law, and her brother.)	William Smith
Bill	Black		M	February 18, 1848	Logan	Murder	Anne Lawson, white	William Smith
Michael Whalen	White		M	September 1, 1848	Ohio	Murder	Female, white (wife)	William Smith
Charles Green	White	21	M	July 12, 1850	Jackson	Murder-Robbery	Timothy Fox, white	John B. Floyd
Lewis Uel	Black	21	M	August 30, 1850	Kanawha	Rape	Becky Skyles, white	John B. Floyd
George	Black		M	May 20, 1853	Jefferson	Attempted murder	Samuel Howell Brown, white	Joseph Johnson
Thomas Board	White	30	M	October 28, 1853	Barbour	Murder	Strickler I. H. Crhislip, white (nephew)	Joseph Johnson
Charles	Black		M	January 6, 1854	Jefferson	Attempted rape	Catherine Kelly, white	Joseph Johnson
John Burns	White		M	September 4, 1858	Ohio	Murder	Mary Ann Montony, white	Henry A. Wise
Preston Turley	White	36	M	September 17, 1858	Kanawha	Murder	Mary S. Turley, white (wife)	Henry A. Wise
William	Black	22	M	October 1, 1858	Gilmer	Murder	William Johnston, white (owner)	Henry A. Wise
John Brown	White	59	M	December 2, 1859	Jefferson	Treason	N/A	Henry A. Wise
Edwin Copple	White	24	M	December 16, 1859	Jefferson	Treason	N/A	Henry A. Wise
John Copeland	Black	25	M	December 16, 1859	Jefferson	Treason	N/A	Henry A. Wise
Shields Green	Black	23	M	December 16, 1859	Jefferson	Treason	N/A	Henry A. Wise
John Cook	White	29	M	December 16, 1859	Jefferson	Treason	N/A	Henry A. Wise
Albert Hazlett	White		M	March 16, 1860	Jefferson	Treason	N/A	John Letcher
Aaron Stephens	White		M	March 16, 1860	Jefferson	Treason	N/A	John Letcher
Nathaniel Hardin	White		M	June 30, 1860	Marshall	Murder	Melissa Morris, white	John Letcher
Reuben	Black		M	June 1861	Greenbrier	Slave revolt	N/A	John Letcher
Ezra Mason	White		M	June 21, 1861	Morgan	Murder	Female, white (wife)	John Letcher
Richard Gatewood	White	21	M	December 20, 1861 (Note: Executed by firing squad.)	Kanahwa (Military)	Desertion	N/A	John Letcher
Henry Kuhl	White		M	May 9, 1862	Braxton	Murder	Male, white	John Letcher
Richard Poole	White		M	March 13, 1863	Ohio	Murder		John Letcher

== 1863–1898 ==
The following executions, all by hanging, took place under local authorities.

Name	Race	Age	Sex	Date of execution	County	Crime	Victim(s)	Governor
Philip Raber	White	20	M	November 27, 1863	Fayette (Military)	Desertion	N/A	Arthur I. Boreman
John Marcum	White	27	M	January 19, 1864	Fayette (Military)	Murder	Andrew J. Farley, white	Arthur I. Boreman
Unknown	White		M	November 11, 1864	Kanawha	Marauding		Arthur I. Boreman
William Loge	White		M	December 2, 1864	Jefferson (Military)	Desertion	N/A (Note: Joined a gang after deserting with whom he committed "depredations upon citizens and straggling soldiers who fell in his way.")	Arthur I. Boreman
Frederick Murphy	White		M	March 3, 1865	Jefferson (Military)	Desertion	N/A	Arthur I. Boreman
Daniel Grogan	White		M	February 9, 1866	Wood	Murder-Robbery	William Abraham Deem, 45, white	Arthur I. Boreman
Thomas Boice	White		M	February 9, 1866	Wood	Murder-Robbery	William Abraham Deem, 45, white	Arthur I. Boreman
Mortimer Gibboney	White		M	June 15, 1866	Wood	Murder-Robbery	William Abraham Deem, 45, white	Arthur I. Boreman
Joseph Eisele	White	33	M	March 6, 1868	Wood	Murder	Joseph Lillenthal and Rudolph Tsutor, white (Note: Serial killer, also murdered Alois Ulrich, white.)	Arthur I. Boreman
William Johnson	Black	22	M	May 19, 1871	Monroe	Murder-Robbery	George H. Hunter, 28, white	John J. Jacob
Labon Walker	White	17	M	November 28, 1879	Wayne	Murder	Patrick Nolan, white	Henry M. Mathews
Henry Jenkins	Black	22	M	November 11, 1881	Fayette	Murder-Robbery	Winfield Saunders, black	Jacob B. Jackson
Felix Kampf	White	65	M	March 7, 1890	Kanawha	Murder	William Kampf and Mary Kampf, 19 and 20, white (son and daughter) (Note: Also suspected of murdering his wife and his employer.)	Aretas B. Fleming
William I. Martin	White	32	M	October 3, 1890	Raleigh	Murder	Ann Martin, white (wife)	Aretas B. Fleming
Sim Johnson	Black	18	M	June 19, 1891	Kanawha	Rape	Alice Bailey, 16, white	Aretas B. Fleming
Henry Christian	Black		M	July 17, 1891	McDowell	Murder	William Crowe, white (police officer)	Aretas B. Fleming
William Maier	White	23	M	November 17, 1892	Ohio	Murder	Marie Yoho Maier, 20, white (wife)	Aretas B. Fleming
Allen Harrison	White	25	M	November 22, 1892	Cabell	Murder	Bettie Adams, 15, white (love interest)	Aretas B. Fleming
John Hardy	Black		M	January 19, 1894	McDowell	Murder	Thomas Drews, black	William A. MacCorkle
Washington Adkins	White	50	M	July 20, 1894	Fayette	Murder-Burglary	Isaac A. Radford, 42, white (Note: Husband of Araminta Jane Radford, whom Jerry Brown was later executed for raping.)	William A. MacCorkle
John W. McFarland	Black	19	M	July 20, 1894	McDowell	Murder	George Andrews, black	William A. MacCorkle
Andrew J. Scott	Black	27	M	October 4, 1895	Kanawha	Murder	Elizabeth M. Scott, 20, black (wife)	William A. MacCorkle
Jim Nichols	Black	28	M	December 13, 1895	Fayette	Murder	Henry Carr, black	William A. MacCorkle
Clark Lewis	Black	21	M	June 25, 1897	Fayette	Murder	Charles Gibson, white	George W. Atkinson
Jerry Brown	Black	35	M	July 25, 1897	Fayette	Rape	Araminta Bays Radford, 42, white (Note: Wife of Isaac A. Radford, whom Washington Adkins was previously executed for murdering.)	George W. Atkinson
Albert Viars	White	21	M	November 12, 1897	Fayette	Murder	Charles Gibson, white	George W. Atkinson
John Morgan	White	22	M	December 16, 1897	Jackson	Murder-Robbery	Three people, white (Note: His adoptive mother, 59-year-old Chloe Green, and two of her children, 18-year-old James Green and 26-year-old Matilda Pfost.)	George W. Atkinson

== 1899–1959 ==
In 1899, West Virginia moved all executions by hanging to a private location within the state penitentiary. Hanging was later replaced with electrocution in 1949 when the state legislature approved its use on February 10th and subsequently signed into law by governor Okey Patteson that March; West Virginia was the last U.S. state to adopt electrocution as a primary execution method.

Name	Race	Age	Sex	Date of execution	County	Crime	Victim(s)	Governor
Shep Caldwell	Black	25	M	October 10, 1899	McDowell	Murder	Rose Crenshaw, black (wife)	George W. Atkinson
Frank E. Broadnax	Black	25	M	November 9, 1899	McDowell	Murder	Sherman McFadden, 16, black	George W. Atkinson
Frank Walker	Black	24	M	December 15, 1899	Fayette	Murder	Thomas Saunders, 23, black	George W. Atkinson
George Carter	Black		M	March 21, 1902	Kanawha	Murder	Virgil Whistler, black	Albert B. White
Lewis Young	Black	22	M	May 1, 1902	McDowell	Murder	Anthony Kell, black	Albert B. White
John Mooney	White	39	M	May 9, 1902	Ohio	Murder-Burglary	James Hervey, 70, white (Note: Mooney previously served time in the Ohio State Penitentiary for the murder of Ashtabula police officer John E. Doran.)	Albert B. White
Frank Friday	White	39	M	May 9, 1902	Ohio	Murder-Burglary	James Hervey, 70, white	Albert B. White
Perry Christian	White	26	M	June 13, 1902	Fayette	Murder	George William Dent, 46, white	Albert B. White
State Henry	Black	21	M	June 24, 1902	Wetzel	Murder-Robbery	John Richardson, black	Albert B. White
Wilfred Davis	White	21	M	June 5, 1903	Randolph	Murder	Page Campbell Marstiller, 47, white (Elkins police chief)	Albert B. White
George Williams	Black	24	M	September 9, 1904	Jefferson	Rape	Laura Kanode, 20, white	Albert B. White
Edward Walton	Black	35	M	July 17, 1908	Harrison	Murder	Beulah Martin, 34, black (girlfriend) (Note: Serial killer, also murdered four other people)	William M. O. Dawson
Arthur Brown	Black	22	M	August 27, 1909	McDowell	Murder-Robbery	Robert Shannon, 18, white	William E. Glasscock
Thomas Wayne	Black	45	M	December 23, 1910	Fayette	Murder-Rape-Robbery	Lottie Ailiff, 17, white	William E. Glasscock
Frank Stevenson	Black	26	M	February 17, 1911	Mercer	Murder	Boles Blagman, 22, white	William E. Glasscock
Jesse Cook	White	22	M	March 10, 1911	McDowell	Murder	Frank F. Bennett, white	William E. Glasscock
William Furbish	Black	28	M	March 17, 1911	Harrison (Note: Change of venue from Lewis County.)	Rape	Flora Anglin, 42, white	William E. Glasscock
John Marshall	Black	19	M	April 4, 1913	McDowell	Murder	Minnie Marshall, black (wife)	Henry D. Hatfield
James Williams	Black	22	M	April 4, 1913	McDowell	Murder	Luther Scott and Rose Williams (wife), 19 (wife), black	Henry D. Hatfield
Henry Sterling	Black	22	M	June 6, 1913	McDowell	Murder	William Patterson, black	Henry D. Hatfield
John Hix	White	26	M	June 6, 1913	McDowell	Murder	Mollie Thompson, white (love interest)	Henry D. Hatfield
Henry Green	Black	28	M	March 6, 1914	Mingo	Murder	Mary Belle Justice, black (girlfriend)	Henry D. Hatfield
Silas Jones	Black	32	M	July 10, 1914	Cabell	Murder	Prudential Jones, black (wife)	Henry D. Hatfield
Will Thomas	Black	30	M	July 2, 1915	Ohio	Murder	Freida Thomas, 22, black (wife)	Henry D. Hatfield
Will Stuart	Black	37	M	July 2, 1915	Greenbrier	Murder	George T. Shires, 58, white (police chief)	Henry D. Hatfield
Nat Jarrell	White	28	M	July 9, 1915	Kanawha	Murder	Silas Frank Nantz, 46, white (sheriff) (Note: Also murdered Edward Ratcliff (30, white) in an unrelated crime.)	Henry D. Hatfield
Charles Forrest	Black		M	September 10, 1915	McDowell	Murder	William Hyden, black	Henry D. Hatfield
Claude Sutton	White	24	M	August 4, 1916	Randolph	Murder-Robbery	John J. Kennedy, 59, white	Henry D. Hatfield
James Lay	Black	25	M	September 1, 1916	McDowell	Murder-Robbery	William Bowman, 42, white	Henry D. Hatfield
Hugh Ferguson	Black	26	M	August 6, 1919	Morgan	Rape	Lola Zimmerman, 26, white	John J. Cornwell
Hugh Bragg	White	21	M	April 30, 1920	Webster	Murder	John Dennis Morton, 33, white (sheriff)	John J. Cornwell
Jacob Lutz	White	46	M	July 22, 1921	Taylor	Murder	James E. B. Phillips, 64, white (Grafton police chief)	Ephraim F. Morgan
Hobart Grimm	White	20	M	August 5, 1921	Brooke	Murder	Stephen W. Gelchek, white	Ephraim F. Morgan
Henry Harbor	Black	29	M	January 7, 1922	McDowell	Murder	Mildred Robinson, 30, black (wife)	Ephraim F. Morgan
Leroy Williams	Black	25	M	March 3, 1922	Kanawha	Rape	Maud R. Stephens, 42, white	Ephraim F. Morgan
Monroe S. Payton	Black	49	M	May 4, 1922	Berkeley	Rape	Hazel Johnson, 10, white	Ephraim F. Morgan
George Banhage	White	39	M	November 2, 1923	Brooke	Murder	Katherine Visnic, 35, white (common-law wife) (Note: Also committed a previous murder which he feared she would inform police of.)	Ephraim F. Morgan
Philip Connizzaro	White	26	M	January 4, 1924	Harrison	Murder	Frank Napolitano, 29, white (Note: Members of a Black hand syndicate. Fierri, who was described as a high-ranking member of the Italian Mafia, confessed to 17 murders and said that Connizzaro and Salamante committed at least three murders.)	Ephraim F. Morgan
Richard Ferri	White	26	M	January 4, 1924	Harrison	Murder	Frank Napolitano, 29, white	Ephraim F. Morgan
Nick Salamante	White	33	M	January 4, 1924	Harrison	Murder	Frank Napolitano, 29, white	Ephraim F. Morgan
Samuel Muratore	White	41	M	February 15, 1924	Harrison	Murder	James Papara, 34, white (Note: Member of a Black hand syndicate.)	Ephraim F. Morgan
Tiny McCoy	White	23	M	September 12, 1924	Pocahontas	Murder	Hallie Lee McCoy, 22, white (wife) (Note: Also murdered his mother-in-law, Mary Burdette Totten (42), and brother-in-law, William Hobart Totten (19).)	Ephraim F. Morgan
Robert Ford	Black	24	M	January 29, 1926	Harrison	Murder	Edward Woody, 52, black	Howard Mason Gore
Harry Sawyer	Black	24	M	April 19, 1926	Mingo	Rape	Olive McCoy Amburgy, 25, white	Howard Mason Gore
Philip Euman	Black	19	M	August 20, 1926	Harrison	Murder-Robbery	Charles Shaw, 19, white	Howard Mason Gore
Henry Jackson	Black	44	M	September 10, 1926	Marshall	Murder	Earl Langfitt, 25, white (guard) (Note: Murdered in the state penitentiary. Jackson was serving a life term for a previous murder in McDowell County.)	Howard Mason Gore
Pierce Jefferies	Black	21	M	February 18, 1927	Greenbrier	Rape	Mrs. William Vance, white	Howard Mason Gore
Wesley Homer Swain	White	42	M	February 3, 1928	Wood	Rape	Aurelia Thornton, 5, white	Howard Mason Gore
Andrew Brady	Black	28	M	March 30, 1928	Hardy	Rape	Odessa Oates, 17, white	Howard Mason Gore
Lawrence Charles Fike	White	31	M	August 10, 1928	Preston	Murder-Robbery	Elroy Leonard, 50, white	Howard Mason Gore
Henry Grogan	Black	20	M	February 8, 1929	Raleigh	Rape	Mary Delle Akers, 27, white (Note: The victim killed herself after Grogan was convicted.)	Howard Mason Gore
Theodore Carr	White	55	M	June 14, 1929	Pocahontas	Murder	Maggie Carr and Lock Cunningham Sharp, 46 and 27, white (wife and brother-in-law)	William G. Conley
Willard F. Morrison	White	24	M	September 13, 1929	Kanawha	Murder	Frank E. Bowen, 38, white	William G. Conley
Walter E. Wilmot	White	20	M	September 13, 1929	Kanawha	Murder	Frank E. Bowen, 38, white	William G. Conley
Walter E. Crabtree	White	35	M	May 9, 1930	Hampshire	Murder	Henry Carter Inskeep, 59, white (Justice of the Peace) (Note: Also murdered 21-year-old Edward Malcom Wolford and 60-year-old jailer Benjamin E. Miller and attempted to murder two women and an 11-year-old girl.)	William G. Conley
Roosevelt Darnell	White	25	M	November 14, 1930	Greenbrier	Murder	William Clarence Holbrooke, 23, white	William G. Conley
William C. Adams	White	40	M	February 20, 1931	Mingo	Murder	Cynthia McGuire, 45, white (aunt-in-law) (Note: Also murdered his wife, Flossie Cobern Adams (28), and his mother-in-law Mallie Campbell (55).)	William G. Conley
Emory Stephens	White	24	M	February 20, 1931	Mingo	Murder-Robbery	Leonard Curtis Ooten Sr., 24, white	William G. Conley
Hiram Francis Hyer	White	54	M	June 19, 1931	Pocahontas	Murder	Evie McGann Hyer, 52, white (wife)	William G. Conley
Harry Powers	White	39	M	March 18, 1932	Harrison	Murder-Robbery	Dorothy Ann Pressler Lemke, 50, white (Note: Serial killer, also murdered mother and her three children and suspected in other murders.)	William G. Conley
James Blount	Black	32	M	May 12, 1932	Greenbrier	Murder	Jesse Mupps, 27, black	William G. Conley
Omer G. Brill	White	21	M	August 10, 1933	Hardy	Murder-Robbery	Lydia M. and Esther Beatrice Burch, 53 and 17, white	Herman G. Kump
Leo Fraser	White	30	M	November 24, 1933	Jackson	Murder	Roy L. Shamblin, 49, white (deputy sheriff) (Note: Also murdered 18-year-old Ralph Edward Harper, white.)	Herman G. Kump
Joseph M. Corey	Middle Eastern	43	M	December 8, 1933	Kanawha	Murder	Katherine Ghiz, Middle Eastern (cousin-in-law) (Note: Also murdered his wife, Ada Ghiz Corey (44).)	Herman G. Kump
Greely Blankenship	White	29	M	January 7, 1935	Mingo	Murder	John Christofane, 48, white	Herman G. Kump
Robert Branch	Black	39	M	July 19, 1935	Ohio	Murder	Brady Hill, 28, white	Herman G. Kump
Frank Pramera	White	23	M	April 13, 1937	Brooke	Murder	Louis Thames, 45, white	Homer A. Holt
William V. Beckner	White	30	M	June 25, 1937	Kanawha	Murder-Robbery	Joseph S. Page, 64, white	Homer A. Holt
Mervin Brown	Black	33	M	September 10, 1937	Mercer	Murder-Robbery	James Garland, 85, black	Homer A. Holt
William B. Read	White	25	M	November 5, 1937	Braxton	Murder-Robbery	William Earle Dollman, 34, white (Note: Previously murdered Ellwood Matthews (68, white) in Maryland four days prior.)	Homer A. Holt
John Travis	White	25	M	March 21, 1938	Cabell	Kidnapping (Note: The victim was badly beaten and later died from his injuries.)	Dr. James I. Seder, 79, white	Homer A. Holt
Arnett A. Booth	White	47	M	March 21, 1938	Cabell	Kidnapping	Dr. James I. Seder, 79, white	Homer A. Holt
Arvil P. Adkins	White	25	M	March 21, 1938	Cabell	Kidnapping	Dr. James I. Seder, 79, white	Homer A. Holt
Raymond Styers	White	29	M	May 13, 1938	Ohio	Murder-Burglary	Anna Bris, 40, white	Homer A. Holt
Byzantine Hartman	White	29	M	June 28, 1940	Upshur	Murder	Wilbur Hoy Grubb, 46, white (constable)	Homer A. Holt
Paul Tross	Black	41	M	December 6, 1940	Mineral	Rape	Mary Lynn Stebbins, 23, white	Homer A. Holt
James Chambers	Black	33	M	March 30, 1945	Randolph	Murder-Rape	Lucy Ward, 73, white (Note: Previously convicted of first degree murder and was serving a life sentence when he escaped from prison. Also stabbed a female inmate after she refused to have sex with him.)	Clarence W. Meadows
William Turner	White	27	M	December 28, 1945	Preston	Murder	Darla Dean Pratt, 15, white	Clarence W. Meadows
Richard L. Collins	White	22	M	January 11, 1946	Kanawha	Murder	Denver Delmas Hill, 39, white	Clarence W. Meadows
William Gordon	White	20	M	January 3, 1947	Mercer	Murder-Robbery	Josephine Evelyn Hamblin Carr, 38, white	Clarence W. Meadows
Paul Burton	White	33	M	January 2, 1948	Logan	Murder	Willard Simpson, 23, white	Clarence W. Meadows
Mark McCauley	White	36	M	January 30, 1948	Mineral	Murder	Joseph Pierce Horne, and Orpha Gay Hovatter, 44 and 51, white (sheriff and state police officer)	Clarence W. Meadows
Matthew Perison	Black	31	M	September 23, 1948	Logan	Murder	Jack Martin, 70, black (father-in-law) (Note: Also murdered his wife (Clancy Martin Perison, 28) and mother-in-law (Pearl Martin, 54).)	Clarence W. Meadows
Lemuel Steed	Black	28	M	January 15, 1949	Fayette	Murder-Robbery	Loren Robert McClurg, 50, white	Clarence W. Meadows
Bud Peterson	Black	53	M	February 25, 1949	Logan	Murder	Bessie Wright, 40, black	Okey Patteson
Harry Burdette	White	27	M	March 26, 1951	Kanawha	Murder	Edward Conrad O'Brien, 31, white	Okey Patteson
Fred Painter	White	33	M	March 26, 1951	Kanawha	Murder	Edward Conrad O'Brien, 31, white	Okey Patteson
James Hewlett Jr.	White	22	M	April 10, 1951	Cabell	Murder-Robbery	Julian Edward Buie, 40, white	Okey Patteson
Oshel Gardner	White	23	M	April 17, 1953	Mason	Murder-Robbery	Roy C. Jackson, 54, white	William C. Marland
Thomas L. Ingram	Black	31	M	March 27, 1954	McDowell	Murder	Melba Lois Bigelow, 7, black (Note: Also murdered her mother, 30-year-old Zenobia Irene Bigelow.)	William C. Marland
Robert L. Hopkins	White	28	M	September 7, 1956	Kanawha	Murder-Robbery	Thomas Lantz Ervine, 30, white	William C. Marland
Eugene H. Linger	White	30	M	June 5, 1958	Upshur	Murder-Robbery	William H. White, 40, white	Cecil H. Underwood
Larry P. Fudge	White	26	M	July 1, 1958	Cabell	Murder-Rape	Inez Lea Robertson Booth, 51, white	Cecil H. Underwood
Elmer Bruner	White	41	M	April 3, 1959	Cabell	Murder-Burglary	Ruby Hood Thomas Miller, 58, white	Cecil H. Underwood

== See also ==
- Capital punishment in West Virginia
- Capital punishment in the United States
