= Edward Walton (serial killer) =

American serial killer

- Born: Wilkes County, Georgia, U.S.
- Died: July 17, 1908; West Virginia Penitentiary, Moundsville, West Virginia, U.S.
- Cause of death: Execution by hanging
- Other names: Frank Harris; Frank Johnson
- Conviction: First degree murder
- Penalty: Death

Details
- Victims: 5
- Span of crimes: 1896–1908
- Country: United States
- States: Alabama; Illinois; Pennsylvania; Ohio; West Virginia

Edward Walton (died July 17, 1908) was an American serial killer who confessed to murdering five people across five states between 1896 and 1908, eventually being hanged for the murder of Beulah Martin in 1908.

== Biography ==
According to his confession, Walton was born in Wilkes County, Georgia, near a town called Pistol (alternative name for Delhi), and his first crime ever was killing a horse in 1890. Six years later, he murdered and then robbed a man in Blossburg, Alabama. Later police investigations couldn't confirm that there was ever such a crime, and Walton was never even sought after.

While in Joliet, Illinois, in 1902, he married his future victim, Edith Hanna, (Note: Walton claimed that he married her as "Edith Hannon", but most newspapers claim that her name is "Hanna") but they were quickly separated for about two years. In August 1904, Walton asked her to come back to him, but when she refused, he traveled to her Chicago address of No. 81 South Peoria Street and then shot her. Hanna died three days later, without regaining consciousness. By then, Walton had fled and yet again avoided arrest.

He then attacked an unnamed man in Joliet, who apparently had connections to Hanna, but the unnamed victim survived. Since everyone who knew him and Hanna in Chicago was clearly aware that he had killed her, Walton fled, but not before considering informing the police department of Chicago. The police did investigate Hanna's murder, even questioning the current family that lived at the address, but neither they, nor the authorities, were certain that Walton was the husband who had murdered the woman.

Under the name of "Frank Harris", Walton traveled to Raton, New Mexico, but, fearing that he might be recognized or caught, he changed course and went to Gallup, taking the name of "Frank Johnson".

In 1906, he had helped rob a stranger in Youngstown, Ohio. In July of the same year, while passing through Shippenville, Pennsylvania, Walton learned that a man called Marion Blue and a couple of other men were planning to rob him. When said man crossed him on the road, Walton shot at him three to four times, fearing that he might draw first. Blue died several months after said shooting.

Traveling on to Steubenville, Ohio, Walton met with a woman named Mamie Gill, (Note: Walton claimed that her second name could have possibly been "Staunton") from Roanoke, Virginia. Pretending to be married, the pair lodged at the house of a Mrs. Brown at 132 South Seventh Street in Steubenville. He then took the woman for a ride-along to a place called "Crow Hollow", where he was expecting some sort of payday. The pair stayed there for three to four days, accompanied by another man whom Gill had lived with before.

On the night between November 16 and 17, after Walton and Gill had quarreled all day, and in a fit of jealousy, the woman was beaten by the huge man. That same night, after returning home from a walk, the pair began to fight yet again. A few miles before their residence, Walton knocked the woman down and then proceeded to beat and kick her. According to his confession, he had worn a heavy pair of shoes on that day, and when he accidentally kicked her in the heart, she died.

Realizing what he had done, Walton then proceeded to carry her on his back for about half a mile before hiding the body in some bushes along the river bank. The body was then supposedly washed away by the waters, and the panicking Walton soon fled the country for a while.

=== Murder of Beulah Martin and capture ===
After killing Beulah Martin on March 3, 1908, in Gypsy, West Virginia, for refusing to have sex with him, Walton was chased after by a posse of around 400 people and ran to the nearby hills. He soon found himself barricaded in a barn, defending himself from the angry mob for two days and seriously injuring three people. However, he immediately surrendered when Sheriff Flanagan threatened that he would blow up the barn.

== Execution ==
After being sentenced to death for killing Martin, Walton proceeded to confess to his previous murders and crimes as well. Shortly before his execution date, he was baptized in jail and seemed remorseful for his deeds. On the day of his execution, despite his gigantic stature and cool demeanour, Walton had to be supported by Capt. Joseph Bloyd and Warden Dawson because of his shaky feet. Although nearly expressionless, reporters present noticed that the prisoner was definitely anguished and troubled because of the look in his eyes.

Shortly after Reverend Sanford concluded the prayer offered to the condemned man, Warden Dawson pressed the button and the trap doors opened. Walton's death was painless, as he had fallen into unconsciousness before the rope was stretched, even though his neck and one of his vertebrae were broken in the process. After the present medical professional, Dr. Boone, made sure that the man was dead, his body was carried away by two convicts to be prepared for burial. It is presumed that Walton's body was buried in the prison cemetery.

== See also ==
- Capital punishment in West Virginia
- List of people executed in West Virginia
- List of serial killers in the United States

== Bibliography ==
- Michael Newton: The Encyclopedia of Serial Killers, 2000
