= List of people executed in the United States in 1959 =

Fifty people, all male, were executed in the United States in 1959, forty by electrocution, nine by gas chamber, and one by hanging.

The state of West Virginia would conduct its final execution this year, before abolishing capital punishment in 1965. Leonard Shockley became the last juvenile to be executed in the United States. John E. Day, who was executed by the military for murdering a South Korean civilian during the Korean War, remains the last American to be executed for war crimes by his own country.

== List of people executed in the United States in 1959 ==
No.	Date of execution	Name	Age of person			Gender	Ethnicity	State	Method	Ref.
No.	Date of execution	Name	At execution	At offense	Age difference	Gender	Ethnicity	State	Method	Ref.
1	January 12, 1959	Willie Horne Jr.	25	23	2	Male	Black	Florida	Electrocution	
2	January 19, 1959	Jimmie Lee Thomas	35	32	3	Male	Black	Florida	Electrocution	
3	February 2, 1959	Dallas Edgar Withers	36	33	3	Male	White	Florida	Electrocution	
4	February 4, 1959	Phillip Slater	36	35	1	Male	Black	Texas	Electrocution	
5	February 6, 1959	J.C. Murray	54	53	1	Male	Black	Georgia	Electrocution	
6	February 27, 1959	James Lewis Feldkamp	25	21	4	Male	White	California	Gas chamber	
7	March 7, 1959	Vernice Lonnie Craft	41	39	2	Male	Black	Arizona	Gas chamber	
8	April 3, 1959	Elmer David Bruner	41	39	2	Male	White	West Virginia	Electrocution	
9	April 10, 1959	Leonard Melvin Shockley	17	16	1	Male	Black	Maryland	Gas chamber	
10	April 13, 1959	Lester G. Graves	23	22	1	Male	White	Pennsylvania	Electrocution	
11	April 24, 1959	Willis Dameron Boyd	24	23	1	Male	White	Virginia	Electrocution	
12	April 24, 1959	William Brown	56	55	1	Male	Black	Virginia	Electrocution	
13	May 4, 1959	Cleveland Thompson	36	26	10	Male	Black	Pennsylvania	Electrocution	
14	May 22, 1959	Richard G. Riser	33	29	4	Male	White	California	Gas chamber	
15	May 22, 1959	Edward Eckwerth	31	28	3	Male	White	New York	Electrocution	
16	May 28, 1959	Milton Williams	28	26	2	Male	Black	Texas	Electrocution	
17	May 29, 1959	Vender Lee Duncan	31	26	5	Male	Black	California	Gas chamber	
18	June 1, 1959	Harley Austin Conner	58	55	3	Male	White	Florida	Electrocution	
19	June 1, 1959	John Frazier	44	42	2	Male	Black	Florida	Electrocution	
20	June 1, 1959	Frank Peterson	28	27	1	Male	Black	Florida	Electrocution	
21	June 5, 1959	Frank Junior Hill	36	35	1	Male	Black	Georgia	Electrocution	
22	June 15, 1959	Thomas Rutledge	33	32	1	Male	White	Tennessee	Electrocution	
23	June 24, 1959	Carl Daniel Kier	23	20	3	Male	Black	Maryland	Gas chamber	
24	June 25, 1959	Charles Raymond Starkweather	20	19	1	Male	White	Nebraska	Electrocution	
25	June 26, 1959	Cecil Herman Ward	26	24	2	Male	White	California	Gas chamber	
26	July 3, 1959	Walter J. Byomin	42	40	2	Male	White	Ohio	Electrocution	
27	July 16, 1959	Ralph Dawkins	24	22	2	Male	Black	New York	Electrocution	
28	July 16, 1959	Jackson Turner Jr.	23	21	2	Male	Black	New York	Electrocution	
29	July 23, 1959	Leroy Keith	52	49	3	Male	Black	New York	Electrocution	
30	July 24, 1959	Lawrence Smith	19	18	1	Male	Black	Arkansas	Electrocution	
31	August 4, 1959	Jessie Doffies Smith	42	41	1	Male	Black	Texas	Electrocution	
32	August 7, 1959	William Charlton	23	22	1	Male	Black	Georgia	Electrocution	
33	August 21, 1959	Stephen A. Nash	35	32	3	Male	White	California	Gas chamber	
34	August 28, 1959	E.C. Daniels	49	47	2	Male	Black	Florida	Electrocution	
35	August 28, 1959	Sam Wiley Odom	20	18	2	Male	Black	Florida	Electrocution	
36	September 18, 1959	Harvey Murray Glatman	31	29	2	Male	White	California	Gas chamber	
37	September 20, 1959	George James Davies	41	38	3	Male	White	Connecticut	Electrocution	
38	September 23, 1959	John E. Day Jr.	30	21	9	Male	Black	U.S. military	Hanging	
39	September 25, 1959	Leo Lee	56	53	3	Male	Black	Arkansas	Electrocution	
40	October 2, 1959	William Young	40	39	1	Male	Black	Arkansas	Electrocution	
41	October 2, 1959	Thomas Walker	52	50	2	Male	Black	Arkansas	Electrocution	
42	October 23, 1959	J.T. House	25	24	1	Male	Black	Arkansas	Electrocution	
43	October 23, 1959	Arthur Hayes	44	43	1	Male	Black	Arkansas	Electrocution	
44	October 26, 1959	Frank Wojculewicz	42	34	8	Male	White	Connecticut	Electrocution	
45	October 28, 1959	Robert Lee Williams	22	20	2	Male	Black	Pennsylvania	Electrocution	
46	November 13, 1959	Willie George City	22	21	1	Male	Black	Florida	Electrocution	
47	November 13, 1959	John Edward Paul	24	Unknown	Unknown	Male	Black	Florida	Electrocution	
48	December 4, 1959	Ernest Cornell Walker	25	24	1	Male	Black	Alabama	Electrocution	
49	December 11, 1959	Edwin Ray Dockery	26	25	1	Male	White	Alabama	Electrocution	
50	December 18, 1959	Eddie Wilson	25	Unknown	Unknown	Male	Black	Georgia	Electrocution	

== Demographics ==
Gender
Male	50	100%
Female	0	0%
Ethnicity
Black	33	66%
White	17	34%
State
Florida	10	20%
Arkansas	6	12%
California	6	12%
Georgia	4	8%
New York	4	8%
Pennsylvania	3	6%
Texas	3	6%
Alabama	2	4%
Connecticut	2	4%
Maryland	2	4%
Virginia	2	4%
Arizona	1	2%
Nebraska	1	2%
Ohio	1	2%
Tennessee	1	2%
U.S. military	1	2%
West Virginia	1	2%
Method
Electrocution	40	80%
Gas chamber	9	18%
Hanging	1	2%
Month
January	2	4%
February	4	8%
March	1	2%
April	5	10%
May	5	10%
June	8	16%
July	5	10%
August	5	10%
September	4	8%
October	6	12%
November	2	4%
December	3	6%
Age
10–19	2	4%
20–29	20	40%
30–39	12	24%
40–49	10	20%
50–59	6	12%
Total	50	100%

== Executions in recent years ==
Number of executions
1960	56
1959	50
1958	50
Total	156

Preceded by 1958	List of people executed in the United States in 1959	Succeeded by 1960
