= Vender Duncan =

Executed American serial killer

- Born: February 18, 1928; Sinclair City, Texas, U.S.
- Died: May 29, 1959 (aged 31); San Quentin State Prison, California, U.S.
- Status: Executed by gas chamber
- Convictions: First degree murder (2 counts); Assault with intent to commit murder Rape; Burglary
- Penalty: Death

Details
- Victims: 3
- Span of crimes: 1955–1957
- Country: United States
- State: California
- Date apprehended: 1957

Vender Lee Duncan (February 18, 1928 – May 29, 1959) was an American serial killer, rapist and burglar who sexually assaulted and killed three elderly women in San Francisco, California from 1955 to 1957. Following an arrest for burglary, he confessed to all his crimes, was convicted for two and eventually executed at the San Quentin State Prison in 1959.

== Early life ==
Vender (Note: First name also spelled 'Vander') Lee Duncan was born on February 18, 1928, in Sinclair City, Texas, a small unincorporated town in Smith County. A troubled youth who often got into fights, he lost an eye at age 17 and later served a sentence for assault with intent to commit murder after stabbing a man 24 times. At an indeterminate point in his life, he drifted towards San Francisco with his common-law wife, Helen Green, working as a house painter to make ends meet. When this proved insufficient, he started burglaring into houses, frequently preying on dwellings inhabited by the elderly and sometimes raping them. Duncan had a prior conviction for rape at the time of his murder trial.

== Murders ==
=== Marceline Herdlick ===
On January 9, 1955, Duncan was walking through California Street when he spotted a second-floor apartment. After climbing up the fire escape, he peeked through the window, where he saw 82-year-old tailor Marceline Herdlick counting some money. Duncan then entered through the window, intending to attack her. Fearing that he might get caught, Duncan hit her in the face, causing the woman to fall to the ground. He then choked her to death before proceeding to copulate with her corpse. After assuring that Herdlick was dead, he then searched through the drawers in an attempt to find any money or valuables, before leaving. On his way, he accidentally dropped a small desk radio, which was left lying on the fire escape.

Herdlick's body, clad only in a nightgown, was found on the afternoon of the next day, after her landlady, Dorothy Waisman, was informed by the cleaning lady that she was unable to open the door. Police were called in to investigate her death, and after questioning the neighbors, who claimed that there were sounds of an apparent scuffle the previous night and that one of them had seen a young man walking away from the apartment at a brisk pace, it was determined that Herdlick was likely murdered. An autopsy later confirmed their suspicion, as the coroner revealed that she had been strangled and then violated post-mortem. The police launched an investigation into all known sex offenders living in the area, but the inquiry yielded no results.

=== Elizabeth Manning ===
On September 4, Duncan was prowling along Webster Street when he chose a first-floor apartment to break into. After climbing the fire escape and entering through an unlocked window, he came across 75-year-old Elizabeth Manning, a retired nurse with a physical ailment. As in his previous murder, he started viciously beating the frail woman, who quickly succumbed to her injuries. After rifling through the apartment in search of something to steal, Duncan then exited through the window, pulling the shades to obscure the body from view, partially tearing them off in the process.

The following day, Rev. William Hughes, a Roman Catholic pastor at the local Sacred Heart Catholic Church, became concerned for Manning, as she attended morning Mass regularly. He then contacted her neighbors, the Sansings, who also suspected that something had happened, noting that her mail box was full, something they considered unusual since Manning was expecting a letter from a niece from Quantico, Virginia, with whom she had plans to move in. After attempting to open the door, which was locked, George Sansing got a ladder and peered through the window, seeing the elderly woman lying face down on the floor. The trio then notified a nearby patrolman, James Hegarty, who forced open a rear door and confirmed that Manning had indeed died. The body was sent for an autopsy, and after coroner Henry W. Turkel determined that the cause of death was a violent assault, authorities were mobilized in search of the killer, who was suspected to be the same assailant who had killed Marceline Herdlick months previously. Upon learning of the murder, Manning's niece, Marie Gerlach, offered a $100 reward for any information that could lead to an arrest.

=== Ada Romig ===
On April 5, 1957, Duncan was in the Grove Street area when he came across 68-year-old Ada Romig, an elderly pensioner who lived nearby. He attacked her in a vacant lot, repeatedly beating her and smashing a brick in her face, before dragging her to nearby Fulton Street. After hurling her body over a brick wall, Duncan continued dragging Romig until he found another vacant lot, where he left her. The semi-conscious woman was left lying in serious condition until a passer-by spotted her and alerted the authorities. Romig, who suffered a fractured skull and numerous bruises, was quickly driven to the hospital, remaining in critical condition until she finally succumbed to her injuries six days later. She was only able to provide a partial description of her attacker, saying that he was "about 40" and had dark hair.

== Arrest and confessions ==
Just three days after the attack on Romig, Duncan struck again, going to the second floor of an apartment complex in Van Ness Avenue in the early morning and knocking on a random door. When the landlady, 73-year-old Agnes Provost, answered, he forced his way in and beat her, before dragging her to the bathroom. Duncan then tore off her clothes, intending to rape her, but Provost scared him off by saying that there was a police station nearby. After he left the apartment, the still-dazed Provost staggered to the nearby police station to report the assault. Despite her injuries, which included a smashed left cheekbone; a fractured jaw and severe cuts and bruises, she was able to give an accurate description of her attacker - a black male, around 30, 5'6" and wearing hornrim glasses, coveralls and either a checkered/printed shirt.

Not long after, Duncan was caught while attempting to burglarize a house, for which he was convicted and sentenced to a year the county jail. Evidently plagued by guilt, he contacted Lt. Al Nelder, the chief homicide inspector, claiming that he had committed the three rape-murders of elderly women in recent years. Nelder scheduled an interrogation, during which Duncan accurately described the locations and small details only the perpetrator could have known. In his confession, he claimed that he was always drunk while committing the crimes, causing him to become very aggressive, and resorted to killing his victims because "he couldn't stand it when they started to scream." His confession, at least regarding the Romig slaying, was corroborated by his wife, who claimed that on the day of her murder, he had returned home with bloodied clothing and a cut on his hand. At the end of his confession, Duncan said that his conscience was now cleared and he intended to plead guilty to all of the crimes, as he preferred to be executed rather than spend the rest of his life behind bars.

== Trial, imprisonment and execution ==
Duncan's trial on April 15, 1958, with the prosecutors deciding to charge him solely for the 1955 murders. Contradicting his previous statements, he entered a double plea of not guilty and not guilty by reason of insanity. As per a new state law, there would be additional hearings to determine whether he was sane and thus eligible to receive the death penalty. After 11 days, Duncan was found guilty on all charges by jury verdict and soon after, sentenced to death.

Over the ensuing months, he attempted to have his sentence commuted by appealing both to the Supreme Court of California and Governor Pat Brown, both of whom refused to do so. His death sentence was confirmed on May 25, 1959, when the SCOTUS refused to hear to his final appeal. As a result, Duncan was executed in the gas chamber at San Quentin State Prison on May 29, 1959.

== See also ==
- List of people executed in California
- List of people executed in the United States in 1959
- List of serial killers in the United States
