= Edward Walton =

Edward Walton may refer to:

- Edward Arthur Walton (1860–1922), Scottish painter
- Edward Walton (serial killer) (died 1908), American serial killer
- Ted Walton (born 1949), Australian rugby league player
