= Ronald Turney Williams =

American career criminal and former fugitive

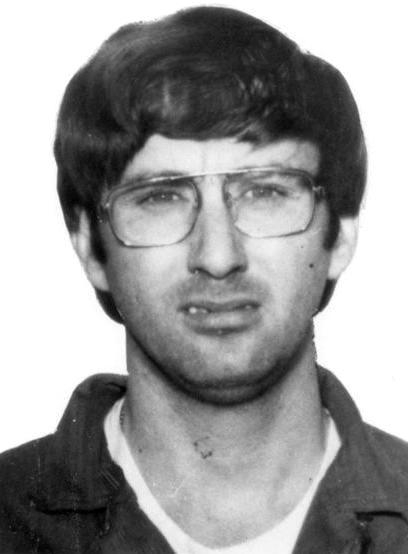
- Photograph taken 1976

FBI Ten Most Wanted Fugitive
- Charges: Murder; Interstate flight
- Alias: Charles Anderson; Billy Lynn Brown; Donald Brown; Bill Hicks; Buddy Ward; Eugene Ward; Kenneth Ward; Bill Williams; Ronald Turley Williams; Ronnie Turley Williams; Ronnie Turney Williams; et alii

Description
- Born: Ronald Turney Williams; April 4, 1943 (age 83); Keystone, West Virginia, U.S.
- Nationality: American
- Race: White
- Gender: Male
- Height: 5 ft 11 in (180 cm)
- Weight: 165 to 170 lb
- Occupation: Laborer; Painter; Salesman; Welder

Status
- Convictions: First degree murder
- Penalty: West Virginia; Life imprisonment Arizona; Death
- Status: Incarcerated
- Added: April 16, 1980
- Caught: June 8, 1981
- Number: 373
- Captured

Ronald Turney Williams (born April 4, 1943) is an American serial killer, burglar, arsonist, kidnapper, prison escapee, and former fugitive. In 1979, Williams and fourteen other inmates escaped from the West Virginia State Penitentiary, where he was serving a life sentence for the 1975 murder of a police officer. During the escape, Williams killed another police officer and committed another murder in Arizona in 1981 during his fugitive state.

In 1981, the FBI tracked Williams to a Manhattan, New York motel, where a gunfight ensued between Williams and the agents, and Williams was seriously wounded and was apprehended. For the murders, Williams received a second life sentence in West Virginia and in 1984 received the death penalty in Arizona. After his Arizona trial, he was transferred back to West Virginia. He remains incarcerated at Mount Olive Correctional Complex in West Virginia.

== Victims ==
- Beckley Police Sargent David Lilly, 1975, Beckley, West Virginia
- West Virginia State Trooper Philip Kesner, November 7, 1979, Moundsville, West Virginia
- John Bunchek, March 21, 1981, Scottsdale, Arizona

== See also ==
- List of death row inmates in the United States § Arizona
- Capital punishment in Arizona
- List of serial killers in the United States
