= Joseph Filkowski =

Polish-American gangster from Cleveland, Ohio

- Born: c.1900 Cleveland, Ohio
- Other names: King Kobra, Smiling Joe, William Blake
- Title: Cleveland police Public Enemy No. 1
- Spouse: Mary Kekic (Stazek Keck) (m. 1963)
- Status: Dead (on parole)
- Allegiance: The Flats Mob
- Conviction: First-degree murder (1932)
- Penalty: Life in prison
- Time at large: 20 months

Details
- Victims: Tony Veryk (or Anton, Anthony)
- Date: June 6, 1930
- Span of crimes: 1918–1932
- Country: United States
- Date apprehended: 1932
- Imprisoned at: Ohio State Reformatory (1919, 1921); Ohio State Penitentiary (1923–1930, 1932–1963)

Joseph Filkowski was a Polish-American gangster active in Cleveland, Ohio, US. A longtime figure in Cleveland's underworld, Joseph Filkowski led the Polish bootlegging gang, the Flats Mob. He was responsible for a rash of bank robberies and jewelry heists in Cleveland and New York City between 1930 and 1932; he was also associated with numerous prominent criminal figures in the Midwest, such as Joseph Stazek and Morris Cohen.

== Early life ==
Filkowski was born in 1900 in a slum of Cleveland, Ohio, to Polish immigrants. He grew up with thirteen brothers, sisters, stepbrothers, and stepsisters and spent his childhood involved in street fighting. His first arrest was at the age of 9, when he was taken into custody for breaking into a candy store and stealing a BB gun. When he went to court, he claimed that he was only following his brother's lead; he received no serious punishment and was let off with a verbal lecture.

When Filkowski was 16 years old, he stole bikes out of a box car; he was never charged for this. At the age of 17, he stole copper wire from a box car. He was sentenced to spend time in the Ohio State Reformatory in Mansfield. He was paroled after a few months and returned to the part of Cleveland where he grew up. On February 22, 1919, he was charged with stealing a car, driving it into a freight yard in Cleveland, breaking into a boxcar, moving stolen goods from the boxcar to the stolen car, and then driving off and selling the stolen merchandise; for this offense, he was sent back to the reformatory in Mansfield for nine months. In August 1921, Filkowski was caught stealing out of a boxcar again, and he was sent to the Mansfield reformatory for a third time, this time for an unknown duration. He was released on parole sometime before August 1923. In August, he was arrested for armed robbery; he was still on parole from the 1921 stealing charge, so his sentence was enhanced by the fact that he was a parole violator. He was sent to the Ohio State Penitentiary in Columbus to serve a 6-20 year sentence, where he learned how to make license plates in the prison workshop. He was released in April 1930 with considerably hardened sensibilities.

== Murder of Tony Veryk ==
On June 6, 1930, only two months after Filkowski's release, Filkowski witnessed 36-year-old lathing contractor Tony Veryk (also referred to in newspapers as Anton Veryk and Anthony Veryk) withdrawing a payroll of $1,500 from a Cleveland bank. Filkowski followed Veryk to an apartment building that was being constructed, where Veryk planned to pay his employees with the money from the payroll. While Veryk was still making his way through the scaffolding, having already paid out $900 of the total $1500, Filkowski approached him and demanded that Veryk give him the remaining $600. When Veryk hesitated, Filkowski shot him in the chest with a .38 caliber pistol and stole the briefcase containing the rest of the money. Filkowski fled in a nearby car where two accomplices were waiting to serve as getaway drivers, while Veryk was rushed to a hospital, where he was pronounced dead on arrival. Meanwhile, some of the construction workers who witnessed the murder were able to provide police with the license plate number of the car in which Filkowski fled. Police later discovered that the license plate numbers were faked.

== 1931-1932 crimes and developments ==
Filkowski spent almost two years at large after the murder of Veryk. Because investigators had a lot of difficulty finding and apprehending him, he was nicknamed "King Kobra." He also had the nickname of "Smiling Joe" among his associates in the Cleveland crime underworld. During his time on the run for the murder and numerous prior and subsequent robberies, Cleveland police designated him "Public Enemy No. 1".

On January 4, 1931, Cleveland detective Pat McNeeley saw a man who looked like Joseph Filkowski. He shot at the man and killed him before a confrontation could begin. The man he shot turned out to be Joseph Fortini, a newspaper route manager for the Cleveland Plain Dealer.

In early May 1931, newspapers reported that Filkowski had eloped with Mary Kekic, the wife of a Cleveland man named George Kekic. Filkowski and Mary Kecik were childhood friends. Those same articles also reported that Filkowski had received plastic surgery on his nose in an attempt to conceal his identity and had also adopted the alias of William Blake, the name that he used at the hospital when he received plastic surgery. Other papers claimed that Filkowski dyed his hair red to avoid detection as well.

On December 5, 1931, Filkowski, alongside a notorious Chicago-based robber named Morris Cohen, held up an Empire Trust and Savings Bank in New York City. Filkowski and Cohen escaped with $1,200. Nine days later, on December 14, Cohen was arrested and confessed to the police that he and Filkowski had been responsible for the bank holdup; Cohen also gave detectives the address to a house where Filkowski stayed on occasion. Detectives in Chicago went to that house, and while they did not find Filkowski, they found that he was making plans with a fellow ex-convict from Los Angeles; the two had discussed Filkowski potentially moving there, and the ex-convict recommended that Filkowski discreetly schedule a meeting to further discuss those plans by responding to a personal ad that the ex-convict would place in a Kansas City newspaper. Detectives used this information to place their own ad in an attempt that would ultimately result in Filkowski's apprehension.

Filkowski held up a clothing store in New York City on January 19; he stole $500 and a gold watch.

== Arrest and trial ==
In mid-February 1932, police received a report that Filkowski was staying at a specific hotel in New York. On February 21, detectives started a three-day stakeout in front of the hotel, waiting for a good opportunity to take Filkowski into custody. On February 24, while he was walking inside of the hotel, Filkowski was arrested by a team of New York City detectives working in concert with Cleveland detectives. Police visited an apartment in Jackson Heights later that afternoon, where Filkowski's lover Mary Kekic was staying; they found $65,000 in jewelry, some of which still had the price tag attached, as well as four loaded firearms. Kekic claimed that the jewelry belonged to her. For her involvement in Filkowski's plots, Kekic received a sentence of 2–4 years, which she served in the Auburn Correctional Facility.

Filkowski went on trial for the murder of Tony Veryk in April 1932. His jury consisted of six men and six women. During the prosecutor's final arguments, Filkowski caused a disruption by springing up from his seat and shouting at him, "You are more guilty than I am." The jury deliberated for approximately 3 hours before returning with a guilty verdict for first-degree murder. However, when deliberating on the sentence Filkowski should receive, they were split 8-4 in favor of a death sentence, with two men and two women hesitant to impose the death penalty; later, they were split 6-6. In the end, they compromised on a life sentence; the jury recommended mercy and imposed a sentence of life imprisonment for Filkowski. Common Pleas Judge Frederick P. Walter formally sentenced Filkowski to life on April 18, 1932. On the same day, he was transported to the Ohio State Penitentiary to begin his sentence.

== Imprisonment and aftermath ==
On December 7, 1936, while serving his life sentence in the Ohio State Penitentiary, Filkowski played a minor role in an attempted prison break. Other prisoners in the group included two other Cleveland-based bank robbers named Frank Benszkowski and Vernon Taylor, and Leroy Keith, a native of Warren, Ohio, who was serving a life sentence that had been commuted from a death sentence for two murders. While being escorted back to their cell block after their evening meal, the prisoners overpowered the guards escorting them and took two as hostages. When other armed guards responded to the situation, the prisoners went to the Deputy Warden's office and surrendered themselves to him. Guards later determined that Filkowski had only helped to transfer notes between prisoners and had no intentions of escaping with the group, so he was not punished. During his first seven years in prison, Filkowski was involved in three separate escape attempts.

On April 15, 1963, Joseph Filkowski was released from prison on parole after serving almost 31 years in prison for Veryk's murder.

On July 6, 1963, Filkowski married Mary Kekic, by then going by the name Mary Stazek Keck. Keck's husband George had divorced her after she eloped, and he had since died; she spent the years after her divorce serving as one of Filkowski's most ardent advocates while he was in prison, petitioning governors, mayors, prosecutors, and newspapers for his release while working a job for $6 a week as a single mother. Filkowski credited Keck for his behavioral transformation behind bars; after Keck began advocating for him, he became a prison trusty and helped in the construction of the Marion Correctional Institution, where he was later transferred for his good behavior while he learned baking skills. Eventually, Maury C. Koblentz, the state corrections commissioner, recommended that Filkowski's life sentence be commuted to time served. In January 1963, Governor Michael V. DiSalle commuted Filkowski's first-degree murder conviction to second-degree murder, which paved the way for Filkowski's release.

Filkowski's life after his release from prison and his marriage is unknown.
