= Elmer Bruner =

Last person executed in West Virginia

Elmer David Bruner
- Born: January 18, 1918; Ohio, U.S.
- Died: April 3, 1959 (aged 41); West Virginia Penitentiary, Moundsville, West Virginia, U.S.
- Status: Executed by electrocution
- Conviction: First degree murder
- Penalty: Death

Elmer David Bruner (January 18, 1918 – April 3, 1959) was a convicted American murderer. He was the last defendant executed by West Virginia, as the state abolished the capital punishment six years after his execution. Bruner was convicted of the May 1957 murder of 58-year-old Ruby H. Miller, who walked in on Bruner burglarizing her house and was then beaten to death. Bruner's trial and conviction took place in 1957, although appeals delayed his execution for almost two years.

== Early life ==
Elmer Bruner was born in Ohio on January 18, 1918. On November 13, 1956, less than a year prior to committing the murder that led to his execution, Bruner married Norma Gertrude Morris; the two were married until his death. The couple lived in Huntington, a city located in Cabell County, West Virginia. Bruner had an extensive criminal record, having been "in and out of correctional institutions" from the age of 10 onward. At the time of the murder, he worked as a handyman taking on odd jobs; he was also out on parole.

== Crime and arrest ==
On May 27, 1957, Ruby H. Miller, a 58-year-old wealthy church worker who sometimes accompanied her husband to his office to help him with his contracting work, returned to her Huntington home from the office in late morning. She found Elmer Bruner burglarizing the house. Miller armed herself with a shotgun, but Bruner disarmed her. Bruner then beat her to death. He also made an attempt to strangle her with a silk stocking, which was still wrapped around her neck when her husband returned home later that same afternoon and found her body. A pathologist that the police called to the home shortly after the body was discovered found the cause of death to be "destruction of the brain. . . . caused by a very hard instrument." The pathologist also found that Miller was raped after she was murdered, although Bruner was never charged for it.

Bruner was arrested for the murder approximately one hour after the body was discovered. At the time of Bruner's arrest, police did not suspect him in the murder of Ruby Miller; he was arrested based on a telephone tip due to his involvement in a separate burglary of one of Miller's neighbors, which had occurred on May 22. Bruner was also a suspect in a third burglary and an armed robbery. The police who searched Bruner found a pair of keys on his person; the keys belonged to Miller's car. Bruner told police that he had parked the car in a certain parking lot in Huntington, and officers found the car in that lot. Police found another pair of keys on Bruner that matched a locker at a Greyhound Lines bus station; when police searched that locker with Bruner's permission (albeit without an official search warrant), they found suitcases containing jewelry that Bruner had stolen from the Miller household.

The same day of the murder, shortly before midnight, Bruner made a confession after hours of questioning. Police prepared a written statement, which Bruner refused to sign until 4:30 pm the following day. In the statement, Bruner confessed to entering the Miller household through a bathroom window after cutting a screen. After ransacking the home, he was preparing to leave when Ruby Miller intercepted him in a bedroom, aiming a shotgun at him. Bruner confessed to grabbing the gun from her before she could fire it and hitting her with an unspecified object (later confirmed to have been the claw end of a hammer) when she started screaming until she fell over. He also claimed that he never intended to strangle Miller with the silk stocking and that his intention was to cover her eyes with it. Bruner claimed that after parking Miller's car at a church in downtown Huntington, he walked home and had just recently arrived when police went to his house to arrest him.

== Trial ==
Shortly after Bruner was charged with first-degree murder, Cabell County Prosecutor Russell L. Daugherty announced that he would seek the death penalty against Bruner. Subsequently, Common Pleas Judge John W. Daniel granted Bruner's motion to have the court provide a mental examination to adjudge his competency to face the death penalty. On June 11, 1957, Common Pleas Judge John W. Daniel revealed that he had been receiving phone calls from an unknown male; according to Daniel, this man threatened to harm Judge Daniel if Bruner were to receive a death sentence. Although Judge Daniel informed the police of the phone calls, he told a United Press International reporter, "I look on it as a joke." On June 16, the Beckley Post-Herald reported that the prosecutor, Russell L. Daugherty, and his wife had both received similar threatening phone calls from an unknown female who identified herself as Bruner's wife, stating that if her husband received the death penalty, then the prosecutor and his wife would be in danger.

Bruner's trial was scheduled to begin on June 22, 1957. In the days leading up to Bruner's trial, two of his potential court-appointed attorneys quit his case, declining to represent him. One of them quit only nine days before the trial's start date. Because of the threats to the prosecutor and the judge, there were over 20 police officers present in the courtroom every day during Bruner's trial.

On June 29, 1957, Bruner's trial concluded. The same day, after deliberating for four hours, the all-male jury found Bruner guilty of first-degree murder. Under West Virginia law at the time, first-degree murder verdicts came with automatic, mandatory death sentences unless the jury recommended mercy. As Bruner's jury did not recommend mercy, he was sentenced to death. The death sentence was formally pronounced on August 2, 1957, with Bruner's first execution date being scheduled to take place on September 27, 1957; however, Bruner's appeals delayed the execution for almost two years.

== Appeals and execution ==
Bruner appealed his case twice to the Supreme Court of West Virginia and once to the Supreme Court of the United States. In one of Bruner's appeals to the Supreme Court of West Virginia in October 1958, he argued unsuccessfully that it was prejudicial to show the jury a gruesome photograph that a police officer had taken of Miller's dead body at the crime scene. Initially, the United States Supreme Court refused to review Bruner's case, after which Bruner's execution date was scheduled for December 12, 1958; however, Justice Earl Warren granted Bruner a stay of execution two days prior to allow time for further appeals, and for Bruner's U.S. Supreme Court appeal to be heard. On January 12, 1959, Bruner's U.S. Supreme Court appeal was rejected; he had attempted to argue that his constitutional rights under the Fourth Amendment were violated prior to his trial due to police not having a warrant to search the locker containing the stolen valuables from the Miller household.

Bruner's final, last-ditch appeal was rejected by U.S. District Judge Harry F. Watkins in March 1959. Ultimately, Bruner's execution date was set for March 27, 1959, but since that day was Good Friday, Governor Cecil H. Underwood granted Bruner a week-long reprieve to reschedule the execution for April 3. After all of Bruner's appeals were rejected, Governor Underwood was the final person remaining who could save Bruner's life; one of Bruner's brothers made a direct appeal after talking to Governor Underwood for ten minutes the day prior to the execution, and a church group based out of Charleston, West Virginia, advocated on Bruner's behalf that afternoon. Ultimately, Underwood refused to intervene, stating that he would only take action if new evidence suggested Bruner's innocence.

On April 3, 1959, Elmer Bruner was executed in the electric chair at the West Virginia State Penitentiary in Moundsville. Bruner's execution was witnessed by 18 prison officials, doctors, and newspaper reporters. After receiving four separate shocks, two prison physicians pronounced him dead at 9:10 PM, eight minutes after he received the first shock.

Although Bruner was the final person to be executed in West Virginia, he was not the last to receive a death sentence; at least one person was sentenced to death after Bruner. Ernest Stevenson was sentenced to death in West Virginia in 1961, but he delayed his death sentence with appeals until the abolition of the death penalty in West Virginia.

In 1965, West Virginia abolished the death penalty, making Bruner the final person to be executed in the state.

== See also ==
- Capital punishment in West Virginia
- Capital punishment in the United States
- List of most recent executions by jurisdiction
- List of people executed in West Virginia
- List of people executed in the United States in 1959
- List of people executed by electrocution
