= List of people executed in the United States in 1961 =

Forty-three people, all male, were executed in the United States in 1961, twenty-four by electrocution, eighteen by gas chamber, and one by hanging.

Billy Monk became the last person to be executed in the United States for a kidnapping that did not result in the victim's death. Monk raped and stabbed his victim, but did not kill her. While Victor Feguer is listed as being executed for kidnapping, he also murdered his victim.

The United States military would conduct its most recent execution this year, that of John A. Bennett. Bennett was also the last person to be executed by the military for rape, and the only person to be executed by the military for the crime of rape in peacetime.

== List of people executed in the United States in 1961 ==
| No. | Date of execution | Name | Age of person | | | Gender | Ethnicity | State | Method | Ref. |
| No. | Date of execution | Name | At execution | At offense | Age difference | Gender | Ethnicity | State | Method | Ref. |
|---|---|---|---|---|---|---|---|---|---|---|
| 1 | January 5, 1961 | Ralph Downs | 28 | 26 | 2 | Male | Black | New York | Electrocution | |
| 2 | January 20, 1961 | Roy Lee Mullins | 24 | 23 | 1 | Male | White | Georgia | Electrocution | |
| 3 | February 17, 1961 | Linwood Bunch | 22 | 20 | 2 | Male | Black | Virginia | Electrocution | |
| 4 | March 10, 1961 | Grover Earl Lucas | 51 | 48 | 3 | Male | White | Virginia | Electrocution | |
| 5 | March 17, 1961 | H.B. Penelton | 30 | 28 | 2 | Male | Black | Ohio | Electrocution | |
| 6 | March 24, 1961 | Thurmond Johnson | 26 | 25 | 1 | Male | Black | Georgia | Electrocution | |
| 7 | April 13, 1961 | John Arthur Bennett | 25 | 18 | 7 | Male | Black | U.S. military | Hanging | |
| 8 | April 21, 1961 | William Stokes | 27 | 26 | 1 | Male | Black | Mississippi | Gas chamber | |
| 9 | April 26, 1961 | Alexander P. Robillard XIV | 20 | 19 | 1 | Male | White | California | Gas chamber | |
| 10 | April 28, 1961 | Quincy Bullock | 48 | 45 | 3 | Male | Black | South Carolina | Electrocution | |
| 11 | May 26, 1961 | Charlie Robinson | 28 | 26 | 2 | Male | Black | South Carolina | Electrocution | |
| 12 | May 31, 1961 | Robert Lee Goldsby | 35 | 28 | 7 | Male | Black | Mississippi | Gas chamber | |
| 13 | June 3, 1961 | Charles Elbert Williams | 20 | 19 | 1 | Male | Black | Texas | Electrocution | |
| 14 | June 8, 1961 | Woodrow Miller | 33 | 29 | 4 | Male | Black | New York | Electrocution | |
| 15 | June 9, 1961 | Jessie James Ferguson | 39 | 37 | 2 | Male | Black | Louisiana | Electrocution | |
| 16 | June 9, 1961 | Nathaniel Lipscomb | 32 | 29 | 3 | Male | Black | Maryland | Gas chamber | |
| 17 | June 15, 1961 | Richard Edward Kiefer | 40 | 35 | 5 | Male | White | Indiana | Electrocution | |
| 18 | June 19, 1961 | William Otis Britt | 27 | 24 | 3 | Male | White | South Carolina | Electrocution | |
| 19 | June 19, 1961 | Douglas Westbury | 31 | 28 | 3 | Male | White | South Carolina | Electrocution | |
| 20 | June 23, 1961 | James Edwards | 30 | 28 | 2 | Male | Black | Texas | Electrocution | |
| 21 | June 29, 1961 | Ronald Rittger | 25 | 23 | 2 | Male | White | California | Gas chamber | |
| 22 | July 12, 1961 | Marion James Linden | 47 | 43 | 4 | Male | White | California | Gas chamber | |
| 23 | July 14, 1961 | J.W. Simmons | 27 | 26 | 1 | Male | Black | Mississippi | Gas chamber | |
| 24 | July 14, 1961 | Walter James Outen | 31 | 29 | 2 | Male | Black | South Carolina | Electrocution | |
| 25 | August 7, 1961 | Norman J. Mackiewicz | 35 | 32 | 3 | Male | White | Florida | Electrocution | |
| 26 | August 7, 1961 | Robert Wesley Davis | 28 | 26 | 2 | Male | White | Florida | Electrocution | |
| 27 | August 11, 1961 | David Francis Early | 32 | 29 | 3 | Male | White | Colorado | Gas chamber | |
| 28 | August 11, 1961 | George Watt | 21 | Unknown | Unknown | Male | Black | Georgia | Electrocution | |
| 29 | August 23, 1961 | Thayne H. Archibald | 22 | 20 | 2 | Male | White | Nevada | Gas chamber | |
| 30 | October 18, 1961 | David Allan Combes | 32 | 31 | 1 | Male | White | California | Gas chamber | |
| 31 | October 23, 1961 | Arthur Grover Schuck | 45 | 41 | 4 | Male | White | Pennsylvania | Electrocution | |
| 32 | October 27, 1961 | Theodore Harson Boykin | 32 | 31 | 1 | Male | Black | North Carolina | Gas chamber | |
| 33 | October 31, 1961 | Honor Robinson | 44 | 42 | 2 | Male | Black | Arizona | Gas chamber | |
| 34 | November 3, 1961 | James Kendrick | 31 | 29 | 2 | Male | White | California | Gas chamber | |
| 35 | November 9, 1961 | Fred Thomas Leath | 40 | 38 | 2 | Male | White | Texas | Electrocution | |
| 36 | November 17, 1961 | Claude Leon Hart Jr. | 31 | 31 | 0 | Male | White | Virginia | Electrocution | |
| 37 | November 21, 1961 | Richard Arlen Lindsey | 31 | 30 | 1 | Male | White | California | Gas chamber | |
| 38 | November 21, 1961 | Billy Wesley Monk | 26 | 24 | 2 | Male | White | California | Gas chamber | |
| 39 | November 24, 1961 | Joe Henry Johnson | 19 | 17 | 2 | Male | Black | Alabama | Electrocution | |
| 40 | November 29, 1961 | Jose Angel Gonzalez | 27 | 26 | 1 | Male | Hispanic | California | Gas chamber | |
| 41 | December 8, 1961 | Jim Cobbs | 46 | Unknown | Unknown | Male | Black | Virginia | Electrocution | |
| 42 | December 19, 1961 | Howard Cook | 33 | 32 | 1 | Male | Black | Mississippi | Gas chamber | |
| 43 | December 20, 1961 | Ellic Lee | 31 | 30 | 1 | Male | Black | Mississippi | Gas chamber | |

== Demographics ==
Gender
| Male | 43 | 100% |
| Female | 0 | 0% |
Ethnicity
| Black | 23 | 53% |
| White | 19 | 44% |
| Hispanic | 1 | 2% |
State
| California | 8 | 19% |
| Mississippi | 5 | 12% |
| South Carolina | 5 | 12% |
| Virginia | 4 | 9% |
| Georgia | 3 | 7% |
| Texas | 3 | 7% |
| Florida | 2 | 5% |
| New York | 2 | 5% |
| Alabama | 1 | 2% |
| Arizona | 1 | 2% |
| Colorado | 1 | 2% |
| Indiana | 1 | 2% |
| Louisiana | 1 | 2% |
| Maryland | 1 | 2% |
| Nevada | 1 | 2% |
| North Carolina | 1 | 2% |
| Ohio | 1 | 2% |
| Pennsylvania | 1 | 2% |
| U.S. military | 1 | 2% |
Method
| Electrocution | 24 | 56% |
| Gas chamber | 18 | 42% |
| Hanging | 1 | 2% |
Month
| January | 2 | 5% |
| February | 1 | 2% |
| March | 3 | 7% |
| April | 4 | 9% |
| May | 2 | 5% |
| June | 9 | 21% |
| July | 3 | 7% |
| August | 5 | 12% |
| September | 0 | 0% |
| October | 4 | 9% |
| November | 7 | 16% |
| December | 3 | 7% |
Age
| 10–19 | 1 | 2% |
| 20–29 | 17 | 40% |
| 30–39 | 17 | 40% |
| 40–49 | 7 | 16% |
| 50–59 | 1 | 2% |
| Total | 43 | 100% |

== Executions in recent years ==
Number of executions
| 1962 | 47 |
| 1961 | 43 |
| 1960 | 56 |
| Total | 146 |

| Preceded by 1960 | List of people executed in the United States in 1961 | Succeeded by 1962 |
