= List of people executed in the United States in 1960 =

Fifty-six people, all male, were executed in the United States in 1960, forty by electrocution, fourteen by gas chamber, one by firing squad, and one by hanging. At least one notable execution was that of kidnapper Caryl Chessman. Connecticut, for its part, would carry out its second-to-last execution. (The last overall would be in 2005).

Robert Johnson became the last person in the United States to be executed for attempted rape. Robert Harmon became the last person in the United States to be executed for an assault in which the victim did not die. He was executed for stabbing a fellow inmate while serving a life sentence for robbery. Harmon wrote to Governor Pat Brown and warned that he would continue to assault or kill fellow inmates unless he was executed. Rejecting an appeal for clemency from the American Civil Liberties Union, Governor Brown noted that Harmon had given a similar warning prior to the stabbing and concluded that he was too dangerous to be kept alive.

== List of people executed in the United States in 1960 ==
No.	Date of execution	Name	Age of person			Gender	Ethnicity	State	Method	Ref.
No.	Date of execution	Name	At execution	At offense	Age difference	Gender	Ethnicity	State	Method	Ref.
1	January 8, 1960	Phillip Henry Hamilton	23	21	2	Male	Black	California	Gas chamber	
2	January 8, 1960	Jimmie Lee Jones	20	18	2	Male	Black	California	Gas chamber	
3	January 8, 1960	David Cooper Nelson	39	35	4	Male	White	New Mexico	Gas chamber	
4	January 14, 1960	Ivory Mason	40	35	5	Male	Black	New York	Electrocution	
5	January 15, 1960	Homer Bunckley	26	25	1	Male	Black	Georgia	Electrocution	
6	January 22, 1960	Leroy Adolph Leick	36	30	6	Male	White	Colorado	Gas chamber	
7	February 1, 1960	Ralph Williams	26	24	2	Male	Black	Florida	Electrocution	
8	February 19, 1960	Robert Lee Lyons	29	26	3	Male	Black	Ohio	Electrocution	
9	February 24, 1960	Earl Lewis Steward	41	39	2	Male	White	Nevada	Gas chamber	
10	March 4, 1960	Ernest Albert	34	33	1	Male	White	Georgia	Electrocution	
11	March 5, 1960	Junior Lee Williams	30	26	4	Male	Black	Texas	Electrocution	
12	March 11, 1960	Robert Dwight Fenton	25	23	2	Male	White	Arizona	Gas chamber	
13	March 30, 1960	James Woode Rodgers	49	46	3	Male	White	Utah	Firing squad	
14	April 22, 1960	Lawrence Leroy Wade	32	30	2	Male	Black	California	Gas chamber	
15	April 28, 1960	Nearvel Moon	19	18	1	Male	White	Texas	Electrocution	
16	April 29, 1960	Columbus Boggs	27	24	3	Male	Black	Alabama	Electrocution	
17	May 2, 1960	Caryl Whittier Chessman	38	26	12	Male	White	California	Gas chamber	
18	May 12, 1960	Pablo Vargas	35	33	2	Male	Hispanic	New York	Electrocution	
19	May 13, 1960	Rogers Boone	28	24	4	Male	Black	Arkansas	Electrocution	
20	May 13, 1960	James Matthew Moore	22	18	4	Male	Black	Arkansas	Electrocution	
21	May 13, 1960	James Eugene Hooton	27	26	1	Male	White	California	Gas chamber	
22	May 17, 1960	Joseph Louis Taborsky	36	32	4	Male	White	Connecticut	Electrocution	
23	May 19, 1960	Henry Flakes	33	31	2	Male	Black	New York	Electrocution	
24	May 19, 1960	Walter T. Green	33	31	2	Male	Black	New York	Electrocution	
25	May 20, 1960	James Albert Boyd	22	18	4	Male	Black	Arkansas	Electrocution	
26	May 20, 1960	Willie Henry Byrd	23	19	4	Male	Black	Arkansas	Electrocution	
27	May 26, 1960	Howard Draper Jr.	28	26	2	Male	Black	Texas	Electrocution	
28	May 31, 1960	Robert Junior Johnson	29	28	1	Male	Black	South Carolina	Electrocution	
29	June 10, 1960	Frank Wilson	53	52	1	Male	Black	Georgia	Electrocution	
30	June 20, 1960	James E. Brooks	29	27	2	Male	Black	Florida	Electrocution	
31	June 23, 1960	Willard H. Phillips	44	42	2	Male	Black	New York	Electrocution	
32	June 24, 1960	Herring Davis	40	39	1	Male	Black	Georgia	Electrocution	
33	June 25, 1960	John Richard Brodersen	34	33	1	Male	White	Washington	Hanging	
34	June 30, 1960	Harry Eugene Fuller	31	29	2	Male	Black	Virginia	Electrocution	
35	July 1, 1960	Nathaniel Johnson	25	23	2	Male	Black	Georgia	Electrocution	
36	July 8, 1960	Richard Thomas Cooper	37	35	2	Male	Black	California	Gas chamber	
37	July 8, 1960	George Williams	30	29	1	Male	Black	Texas	Electrocution	
38	July 15, 1960	Willie Edward Philpot	29	27	2	Male	Black	Texas	Electrocution	
39	July 28, 1960	Edward Leon Williams	30	26	4	Male	White	Oklahoma	Electrocution	
40	August 9, 1960	Robert S. Harmon	27	26	1	Male	White	California	Gas chamber	
41	August 12, 1960	George Moses	30	29	1	Male	Black	Texas	Electrocution	
42	August 27, 1960	Eusebio Regalado Martinez	27	24	3	Male	Hispanic	Texas	Electrocution	
43	August 31, 1960	James Spence	32	30	2	Male	White	Oklahoma	Electrocution	
44	September 7, 1960	George Albert Scott	36	34	2	Male	White	California	Gas chamber	
45	September 16, 1960	Emmett Earl Leggett	23	19	4	Male	White	Arkansas	Electrocution	
46	September 16, 1960	William Frank Nail	28	26	2	Male	White	Arkansas	Electrocution	
47	October 1, 1960	Joseph Louis Cosby	24	22	2	Male	Black	Ohio	Electrocution	
48	October 28, 1960	John Bracey	27	26	1	Male	Black	Arkansas	Electrocution	
49	October 28, 1960	Lawrence Gene Moore	21	19	2	Male	Black	Arkansas	Electrocution	
50	November 7, 1960	William James Tines	37	34	3	Male	Black	Tennessee	Electrocution	
51	November 10, 1960	Nathaniel Young	42	41	1	Male	Black	Mississippi	Gas chamber	
52	November 21, 1960	Oscar James Wimis	44	43	1	Male	Black	Georgia	Electrocution	
53	November 30, 1960	Samuel Morris Holmes Jr.	22	20	2	Male	Black	Texas	Electrocution	
54	December 1, 1960	Ronald Chapman	20	19	1	Male	Black	New York	Electrocution	
55	December 15, 1960	Ray Allen Young	34	32	2	Male	White	Oklahoma	Electrocution	
56	December 28, 1960	Raymond Leslie Cartier	32	29	3	Male	White	California	Gas chamber	

== Demographics ==
Gender
Male	56	100%
Female	0	0%
Ethnicity
Black	35	63%
White	19	34%
Hispanic	2	4%
State
California	9	16%
Arkansas	8	14%
Texas	8	14%
Georgia	6	11%
New York	6	11%
Oklahoma	3	5%
Florida	2	4%
Ohio	2	4%
Alabama	1	2%
Arizona	1	2%
Colorado	1	2%
Connecticut	1	2%
Mississippi	1	2%
Nevada	1	2%
New Mexico	1	2%
South Carolina	1	2%
Tennessee	1	2%
Utah	1	2%
Virginia	1	2%
Washington	1	2%
Method
Electrocution	40	71%
Gas chamber	14	25%
Firing squad	1	2%
Hanging	1	2%
Month
January	6	11%
February	3	5%
March	4	7%
April	3	5%
May	12	21%
June	6	11%
July	5	9%
August	4	7%
September	3	5%
October	3	5%
November	4	7%
December	3	5%
Age
10–19	1	2%
20–29	26	46%
30–39	21	38%
40–49	7	13%
50–59	1	2%
Total	56	100%

== Executions in recent years ==
Number of executions
1961	43
1960	56
1959	50
Total	149

Preceded by 1959	List of people executed in the United States in 1960	Succeeded by 1961
