= Harvey Glatman =

Executed American serial killer and rapist (1927–1959)

- Glatman's c. 1951 mugshot
- Born: December 10, 1927; The Bronx, New York, U.S.
- Died: September 18, 1959 (aged 31); San Quentin State Prison, California, U.S.
- Other names: The Lonely Hearts Killer; The Glamour Girl Slayer; Johnny Glinn; Frank Wilson; George Williams
- Status: Executed by gas chamber
- Convictions: First degree murder (x2); First degree grand larceny
- Penalty: Death

Details
- Victims: 3–4
- Span of crimes: August 1, 1957 – July 12, 1958
- Country: United States
- States: California, possibly Colorado
- Date apprehended: October 31, 1958
- Imprisoned at: New York State Reception Center in Elmira, Sing Sing Correctional Facility, and San Quentin State Prison

Harvey Murray Glatman (December 10, 1927 – September 18, 1959) was an American serial killer and rapist during the late 1950s known as the Lonely Hearts Killer or the Glamour Girl Slayer. He would use several pseudonyms, posing as a professional photographer to lure his victims with the promise of a modeling career.

== Early life ==
Harvey Glatman was born on December 10, 1927, in The Bronx, New York City, the only child of Albert and Ophelia (née Gold) Glatman; the family moved to Denver, Colorado, early in his childhood. Glatman was of Jewish descent. An intelligence quotient test measured his level of intelligence at 130.

Glatman exhibited antisocial and sadomasochistic tendencies as a small child, tying a string around his penis and pulling on it to achieve a sexual thrill. When he was aged 12, he developed the habit of placing a rope around his neck, running it through the bathtub drain and pulling it tight against his neck. His mother consulted a family physician who said he "would grow out of it."

As a teenager, Glatman began breaking into women's apartments and stealing random items, including lingerie and, in one incident, a handgun. Over time, he escalated to stalking women and sexually assaulting them. In August 1945, he pleaded guilty to first degree grand larceny and was sentenced to 5–10 years in Elmira Reformatory. Two years later, Glatman was transferred to Sing Sing to serve out the rest of his sentence. During his imprisonment he was diagnosed with "psychopathic personality - schizophrenic type having sexually perverted impulses as the basis of his criminality." He was paroled in 1948.

== Murders ==
Glatman moved to Los Angeles in 1957 and started trawling modeling agencies looking for potential victims. He would contact them with offers of work for pulp magazines, take them back to his apartment, tie them up and sexually assault them, taking pictures all the while. He would then strangle them and dump the bodies in the desert. Glatman's two known model victims were Judith Dull and Ruth Mercado. He met his third victim, Shirley Ann Bridgeford, through a Lonely Hearts ad in the newspaper.

Glatman is also a suspect in the slaying of Dorothy Gay Howard, whose corpse had been discovered by hikers near Boulder, Colorado, in 1954, with no clues to her identity. Dubbed "Boulder Jane Doe", she remained unidentified until October 2009, when Boulder authorities were contacted by Dr. Terry Melton of Mitotyping Technologies in State College, Pennsylvania, who said that her lab had made a match between the victim's DNA profile and that of a woman who thought the victim might be her long-lost sister. The victim was then positively identified as Howard, an 18-year-old woman from Phoenix, Arizona.

== Arrest and execution ==
Glatman was arrested in 1958, caught in the act of kidnapping what would have been his fourth known victim, Lorraine Vigil (1936–2002). A patrolman saw him struggling with a woman at the side of the road and arrested him. He confessed to three murders and eventually led the police to a toolbox containing pictures he had taken of his victims.

Glatman was found guilty of two counts of first degree murder and sentenced to death. He appeared to accept the sentence, even specifically asking the warden to do nothing to save his life. He was executed in the gas chamber of San Quentin State Prison on September 18, 1959.

== Media ==
- Parts of Glatman's career were fictionalized by Jack Webb in 1966 for the Dragnet two-hour television movie starring his character Sgt. Joe Friday. The film convinced NBC executives to relaunch as a TV series in 1967 for a four-year run, although the movie itself was not aired until 1969. Some of the dialogue was reportedly drawn from Glatman's own statements to police. LAPD Captain Pierce Brooks, who was involved in Glatman's arrest and interrogation, served as a technical advisor for the film.
- Glatman's killings are briefly described in James Ellroy's memoir My Dark Places. Glatman confesses to the three known murders, but is cleared of suspicion with regard to the 1958 murder of Ellroy's mother.

== See also ==
- Harvey Carignan, an American serial killer nicknamed "The Want-Ad Killer".
- Lonely hearts killer
- List of people executed in the United States in 1959
- List of serial killers in the United States
