= Thomas D. Carr =

American murderer and self-confessed serial killer

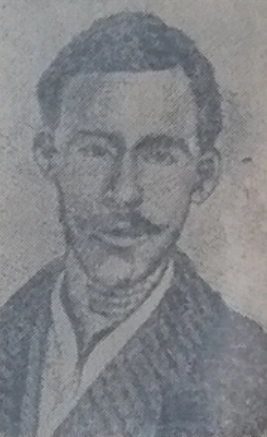
- A drawing of Carr shortly before his execution
- Born: Thomas David Carr; March 6, 1846; Sugar Hill, Virginia, U.S.
- Died: March 24, 1870 (aged 24); St. Clairsville, Ohio, U.S.
- Cause of death: Execution by hanging
- Conviction: First degree murder
- Penalty: Death

Details
- Victims: 1–15
- Span of crimes: 1860s–1869
- Country: United States
- States: Ohio (convicted); Virginia, South Carolina, Mississippi, Tennessee, North Carolina, Maryland, West Virginia (confessed)
- Date apprehended: January 22, 1869

Thomas David Carr (March 6, 1846 – March 24, 1870) was an American thief, arsonist, war criminal and self-confessed serial killer. He was hanged in 1870 for murdering 13-year-old Louisa Fox in Kirkwood Township, Belmont County, Ohio, and shortly before his execution, he confessed to murdering 14 men, including to participating in a famous 1867 murder that occurred in West Virginia.

== Biography ==
=== Upbringing and military service ===
Thomas David Carr was born on March 6, 1846, as the fourth son in a family of five boys and three girls. His father, William Carr, had been an abusive parent who treated him harshly throughout his childhood. Three years after his birth his family began moving frequently around West Virginia, living in Woods' Run, Fulton, Centre Wheeling and settling in North Wheeling. Thomas grew up as a troublesome child, who frequently fought with other children in the street.

He formed bad associations, and when he began work, he did jobs for river men, brickyard hands and colliers. In 1854, he was sent to prison for unknown reasons. Carr claimed that he was intimate friends with a John H. Burns and his accomplice Oscar Myers, who had murdered a woman named Mary Montonie. Burns had been sentenced to death, while Myers to life imprisonment. While on a visit to the prison, Carr had slipped poison for Burns to kill himself with, but the man was "too cowardly to do it". Shortly after, his family moved again, this time to Belmont County in Ohio.

Soon after, the now 16-year-old Carr was enlisted with the 16th Ohio Infantry and served 3 months in West Virginia. Following this, he enlisted for 3 years in the 18th Ohio Infantry, and when that term expired, he enlisted to another division yet again. During his military career, Carr was frequently arrested due to misconduct, and twice sentenced to be shot for violating regulations. On one such occasion, he was forced to dig his own grave. Then-president Abraham Lincoln felt pity on the boy, and pardoned him.

=== War crimes ===
The first murder that Carr confessed to took place near Virginia's Greenleaf Mountain. He had wandered away from his regiment so he could drink. While lying about in the woods, a citizen had tried to arrest him. As the man approached, Carr took out his gun and shot him in the left breast before fleeing. The next day the man died from his injuries.

Shortly after, while a prisoner in Columbia, South Carolina, Carr had learned that a man named Edward Berringer was attempting to join the Confederate States Army. Along with two comrades from the 14th Ohio Infantry, the trio strangled Berringer. After his release, he rejoined the 18th Ohio Infantry and was discharged to Mississippi, where he shot two rebel soldiers, one of them while on picket duty. When his time expired in the 18th Regulars, Carr turned towards the 4th Ohio Infantry, serving his duty without much trouble, except once, when he shot at an Annie Whalen in Clarksburg, a prostitute whom he had connections to. Enlisting afterwards in the 180th Ohio Infantry, Carr was serving in Belmont County when he was allegedly prevented from arresting a deserter by a Dr. L. Voorhees (Voorhees claimed this never happened).

While fighting in the Battle of Franklin, Carr claimed that he had killed and then robbed two men. Following this, he fought in the city of Wilmington, North Carolina at a place called Wise's Forks, where he crouched behind a pine log and killed an unaware rebel sergeant, who had just passed by. He pilfered the man's clothes afterwards. His next murder was that of a soldier of the 84th Ohio Infantry, whom Carr had been placed to guard, and then killed after the man had tried to escape. Carr also claimed that he was one of a gang of 11 men who raided a sutler's shop in Petersburg, Virginia, stamping the owner to death in the process.

While near Raleigh, North Carolina, a gang of 15 soldiers (including Carr) had learned that a Federal soldier had been hanged by the Confederates in the cellar of the house of a prominent southerner. When they arrived at the house, they found a rich planter's residence. Carr claimed that the soldiers searched all rooms of the residence, but found no men, only the women who were left by the rebels. Finally, the gang descended into the cellar, where they found a soldier hanging from the ceiling, clothed in "Union Blue". Enraged, the soldiers burned down the house, watching the women flee the burning residence. One of them, a 17-year-old girl, had her dress burning from the fire, but was extinguished by the men. However, they then gang raped and tortured the girl in a brutal way, leaving her for dead in a nearby orchard without any assistance. When he "learned" of the crime the following day, Carr said that "the men that done that ought to be hung."

After this, Carr was guarding a house in Raleigh when he shot a man who was trying to break inside. He had also thrown a colored waiter who refused to give him any food overboard while on a steamer travelling from Morehead City to Fort Monroe. While in Baltimore, Maryland, Carr attempted to ride on a street car without paying a fare. The conductor noticed this and, while trying to kick him off, had one of his ears nearly severed by the freeloader. The driver then tried to help his colleague, but was stabbed in the bowels by Carr and died soon after. The killer then mingled with the crowd and shaved his mustache afterwards, successfully escaping. In Newark, Ohio, after finishing a bottle of whisky, Carr threw it, hitting a random stranger who was standing on the platform, splitting the man's skull open. Just at that moment, a train full of soldiers was passing by and Carr jumped on, escaping justice once again.

=== Murder of Aloys Ulrich ===
After returning to Wheeling following his army service, Carr began working again, first for a man named James Sweeney in a brickyard, then for a James Bodley, whom he worked for until May 1867. One night, he escaped from work. Early the following morning, while strolling around town, Carr met a German traveller by the name of Joseph Eisele (alias John Schaefer). The man had just arrived from Parkersburg on a steamboat named "Express", and had left his baggage on the boat. Eisele told Carr that he wanted him to help kill his companion, a fellow German named Aloys Ulrich.

While the trio were travelling along the Hempfield Railroad, Eisele got behind Ulrich and struck with a hatchet (that same hatchet Eisele would later use for murdering another man in Parkersburg). Carr, who was afraid to be the next victim, struck Ulrich with a rock, and then Eisele finished him off with the hatchet. After killing him, the duo rummaged through his pockets, finding a lot of francs and some paper money.

They divided the money, with Carr getting the bigger share, and parted ways. Carr would later claim that he'd seen Eisele in Pemberton House, where he was having the time of his life. Following this murder, he felt very uneasy, even considering giving himself up, since Carr was afraid that after the coroner's inquest, Eisele would implicate him. However, that never happened, and he never saw Eisele again.

Following this, Carr considered peddling the money, but this murder began haunting him and so he decided to join the Methodist Episcopal Church, headed by Reverend Ball. For some time, he felt better, with people encouraging him. Despite this, Carr soon grew restless and began talking in his sleep due to fear of being found out. He decided to leave Wheeling, and to never return.

=== Murder of Louiza Fox ===
Carr soon moved back to Belmont County, where he came into contact with a 13-year-old girl named Louiza Catharine Fox in Sewellsville where she was employed as a house worker at the home of Alexander Hunter, a local coal mine owner who also employed Carr in the mines. Immediately, Carr became infatuated with the 13-year-old and began to maliciously stalk the child. When both she and her parents told him she was too young to marry, he desperately tried to talk her parents into forcing her to marry. Rebuffed by both the parents and the child, he became infuriated and decided that he'd kill her. He stole a razor from the shoe shop of an Alexander Williams, and turned towards the house of a Mrs. Hunter, for whom Fox was working for as a servant girl. He lied to the girl that he had been to her parents' house and that they wanted her to visit them to their grandparents'.

He then asked Louiza one last time, and she rejected him yet again. Following this, Carr drank around four bottles of hard cider, which heavily intoxicated him. Learning that Fox was going to go to her grandparents', he got the stolen razor and went on to the road, deciding to wait by a large oak tree. He changed his mind and decided to get a gun and shoot Fox. He visited two separate houses to ask for one, but neither had a gun. After returning to the fields, Carr noticed some tracks, and immediately realised they were Louiza 's.

He then ran up to the hill, and waited until he saw Louiza walking along the road with her little brother, Willie. Carr hid behind a fence, before Louiza herself noticed him and began talking to him. The pair conversed for a long while, both of them eventually breaking down into tears. Louiza kept telling him that they couldn't get married due to her parents' disapproval. Carr then told Willie to go down the road and that they would follow him soon after. After arguing for a bit, both began walking down the road, with Willie being about 10 yards ahead of them. By then, Carr had decided to kill her when they reached the ravine, continuing their talk in the meantime. He asked her if it was enough for a man to commit a crime, with her crying out that she wished for death due all the problems she was facing.

Upon hearing this, Carr grabbed her by the forearm and began walking towards the ravine, asking her if she was ready to die. The girl pleaded for her life, but to no avail. When he reached a gutter, Carr pulled out the stolen razor and began slashing the right side of her neck, across the jugular vein, making a wound that was 10 inches long and 2 inches deep. He then proceeded to make between 10 or 12 more cuts on her neck, one on the hand and a final on the breast.

After leaving the body, Carr started going up the hill, considering cutting his throat near a white oak tree, but then deciding to go back in Sewellsville with a gun and kill Mrs. Hunter. He saw that he was being chased, due to the fact that Willie had informed his father of the deed. Carr began knocking on every door he came across, asking the owners politely if they had any guns so he could "kill a rabbit", before finally arriving at the house of a Mr. Young, whose wife finally gave Thomas a gun. After arming himself, cut through the woods and began walking on the same road on which he had followed Louiza, feeling weakened and walking slowly, as he had not eaten anything.

He then saw a group of people surrounding the murder site and looking for him. Carr noticed that a lot of people were coming in and out from the Fox residence, and decided to take a look. After passing by several of the posse, cocking his gun and preparing to shoot at any time, Carr got lucky and each of them passed by him. When he finally got to the kitchen window, he saw Louiza's body being dressed up by the doctors. He immediately felt that he should go kiss her and shake her hand, but had to wait as there were still people inside. Continuing to observe the people entering and leaving, he saw Louiza 's body, remarking that she was "looking very pale; but [he] thought her's [sic] was the most beautiful corpse [he] ever saw." However, despite feeling utterly miserable, Carr decided to hide away in the nearby bank until the morning.

== Arrest ==
Around dawn of the following day, Carr came out of the bank and returned to his hiding place, deciding to observe for a while. He contemplated going back to the house and seeing Louisa's body again, but was afraid that there would be too big of a crowd and that they would see him. So instead, he decided to get his handkerchief and tie up his gun, placing it on a rafter and putting the muzzle to his heart. He then arranged a string that, when pulled, would pull the gun toward him and kill him instantly.

He jerked his hand and the bullet was lodged into his breast, to the left of his heart. Carr fell on his back, and began checking if the bullet had come out of him or not, which it hadn't. After this, he got up and walked over to the spring 30-40 yards from there, and had a drink. Soon after, the heard somebody (the Foxes) screaming "Murder! Murder! Murder!", and immediately upon hearing this, Carr grabbed the stolen razor and began cutting his throat, before jabbing it straight into his windpipe, almost severing it completely. Due to how fast the blood was flowing out, he fainted. He survived, however, and was immediately taken to court.

== Trial, sentence and death ==
In June 1869, Carr was tried and found guilty of murdering Louisa Fox, being sentenced to death for the crime. His lawyer lodged an appeal, and during this time, Carr tried to kill himself again by cutting one of his veins open.

On the day of his execution, Carr was ready to die. While waiting in his cell, he was visited by two girls who were enamored with him. He gave them a photograph and some silver rings, and asked them to remember him, which they promised would do. After being put on the scaffold, he began saying prayers and singing hymns, asking for God to receive him after he dies. He then made a long speech, telling his life story and how he was harshly disciplined as a child, and that the future generations should not be like him. He blamed most of his confessed murders on his heavy drinking, saying the following:

"The bitter cup they call whisky has brought me here. It will ruin any man. Whisky, whisky is what brought me where I now stand - a condemned murderer, about to be launched into eternity. Oh, take my advise, and banish it. - Banish whisky, and you banish crime. Look at your prisons, look at your poor, look at the gallows erected here to hang me - a soldier who fought five years to defend the Government. Keep liquor away from your citizens; banish whisky, and you will have no more wicked men like Tom Carr to execute. I pray earnestly that God will break up the dram shops. Pray for it, every one."

After finishing with a short prayer for the many crimes in his life, the trap door was opened. Carr's neck wasn't immediately broken, but he slowly strangled and soon died. After physicians pronounced him dead, his body was buried in the local pauper's lot in St. Clairsville. His execution was the first legal execution ever carried out in the county.

== Legitimacy of confessions ==
Some people expressed doubts about Carr's confessions about other murders prior to his execution. He declined to indicate any dates, and some of his statements had even been disproven. For instance, he claimed that he had somehow shown the police where John H. Burns was hiding after killing Montonie, but this was false, as many of Burns' workmen testified that he hadn't hid at all, and was arrested while at work. And concerning the Ulrich murder, he claimed that he had mashed the man's head with a stone, while Justice Johnson noted that the skull wasn't broken, except for the part where Eisele had struck it with the hatchet.

== See also ==
- List of serial killers in the United States

== Bibliography ==
- Michael Newton: The Encyclopedia of Serial Killers, 2000
