= Leroy Keith (criminal) =

Executed American serial killer

- Press photograph of Keith
- Born: 1907; Warren, Ohio, U.S.
- Died: July 23, 1959 (aged 51–52); Sing Sing Prison, New York, U.S.
- Other names: "Cut" "Frisco" "New York"
- Status: Executed by electric chair
- Convictions: Ohio; Second degree murder (reduced from first degree murder on appeal); New York; First degree murder
- Penalty: Ohio; Death; commuted to life imprisonment New York; Death

Details
- Victims: 3
- Span of crimes: November 1934 – December 1956
- Country: United States
- States: Ohio, New York
- Date apprehended: 1959

Leroy Keith (1907 – July 23, 1959) was an American criminal and serial killer who killed three people in Ohio and New York during robberies. Originally sentenced to death twice in Ohio, he was released on parole and went on to kill two more people before being executed at Sing Sing in 1959.

== Murders ==
=== Fred Greist ===
On July 24, 1934, 52-year-old mill worker Fred Greist was sitting in his parked car in front of a movie theater in Warren, Ohio, when he was approached by a young man who demanded that he get out of the car. While it is unclear if Greist had protested, when he exited the vehicle, he was shot in the heart and died instantly. In the investigation, police officers arrested a man named Ernest Baugh, who claimed that the killer had been Leroy Keith, a local man who had previous convictions for auto theft and burglary.

According to Baugh, Keith had planned to rob a local store and needed a car when he came across the unfortunate Greist. A short time later, Keith was captured by police officers after they saw him in a car which had been reported stolen in Akron. He was brought to trial, convicted of first degree murder, and sentenced to death by Justice Lynn B. Griffith.

Keith was later given a new trial, and was again sentenced to death. His lawyers submitted an appeal to the Ohio Supreme Court, and managed to have their client's conviction reduced to second degree murder and changing his sentence to life imprisonment, which he would serve at the Ohio State Penitentiary.

In the following years, Keith garnered a reputation as a dangerous prisoner who would frequently attack fellow inmates, usually with four razor blades at once, handling two blades in each hand. Because of this, he received the nickname "Cut". On December 7, 1936, while still at the Ohio State Penitentiary, Keith and several inmates, including fellow lifer Joseph Filkowski, played a role in an ultimately unsuccessful escape attempt that involved overpowering two guards and taking them as hostages.

In 1945, he was first considered for parole, but was denied, with Justice Griffith writing to the parole board that "Under no consideration should [Keith] be placed on parole as he is a dangerous character and a menace to every law abiding citizen..." On October 13, 1953, Keith was transferred to the London Correctional Facility in London.

Three years after his transfer, he was again considered for parole. This time, the parole board didn't consult with Griffith, and he was released on March 6, 1956. At his first, he was to live with relatives in New York, but later changed the location back to Ohio. On August 5, he wrote to members of the parole board that his leniency "would be remembered to all eternity".

=== Coburn Von Gunten ===
Keith was reportedly living with relatives in Youngstown, doing odd jobs for a living, his last one being at the county engineer's office. In November, with the help of ex-convict Louis Johnson, 27, and 16-year-old Joseph Reinthaler, Keith planned several robberies in the Youngstown and Akron areas, but none of them came to fruition. Deciding that they would need a getaway vehicle, the trio cruised the streets in search for a suitable victim on the night before Thanksgiving, when Keith found 40-year-old Coburn Von Gunten, an executive member for the McNeil Machine & Engineering Company who was returning home from an office party.

When Von Gunten refused to let Keith take his car, he was shot twice, but still managed to start up the car's engine. He was shot another time, but before he could be finished off, a passing police cruiser chased after his assailant and the accomplice. After exchanging gunfire, the officers lost sight of Keith, but managed to capture Reinthaler. Von Gunten was transported to the Summa St. Thomas Hospital, where he died from his injuries an hour and a half after being admitted. The detectives questioned Reinthaler, who identified the two men as Leroy Keith, a recently paroled murderer, and the other man was ex-convict Louis Johnson. Wanted bulletins were issued for both men, with Akron police scrutinizing the Ohio parole board members after learning that they had failed to consult Justice Griffith on the inmate's rap sheet.

The next day, Johnson turned himself in to the Youngstown police. He was queried as to whether he and Keith had anything to do with a recent double murder committed in a Uniontown grocery, where the owner Reynaldo Amodio and clerk Paul Cain had been shot dead and robbed. Johnson denied responsibility, claiming that he had been with a girlfriend in Farrell, Pennsylvania, an alibi later proven by several acquaintances. Ballistics tests later concluded that the killings were unrelated. While Johnson and Reinthaler were charged with Von Gunten's murder, the manhunt for Keith continued. Louis Johnson was later convicted of first degree murder in Ohio, but avoided execution after the jury in his case recommended mercy. Reinthaler was tried as a juvenile and sentenced to an indeterminate term in the Ohio Reform School.

=== David Suro ===
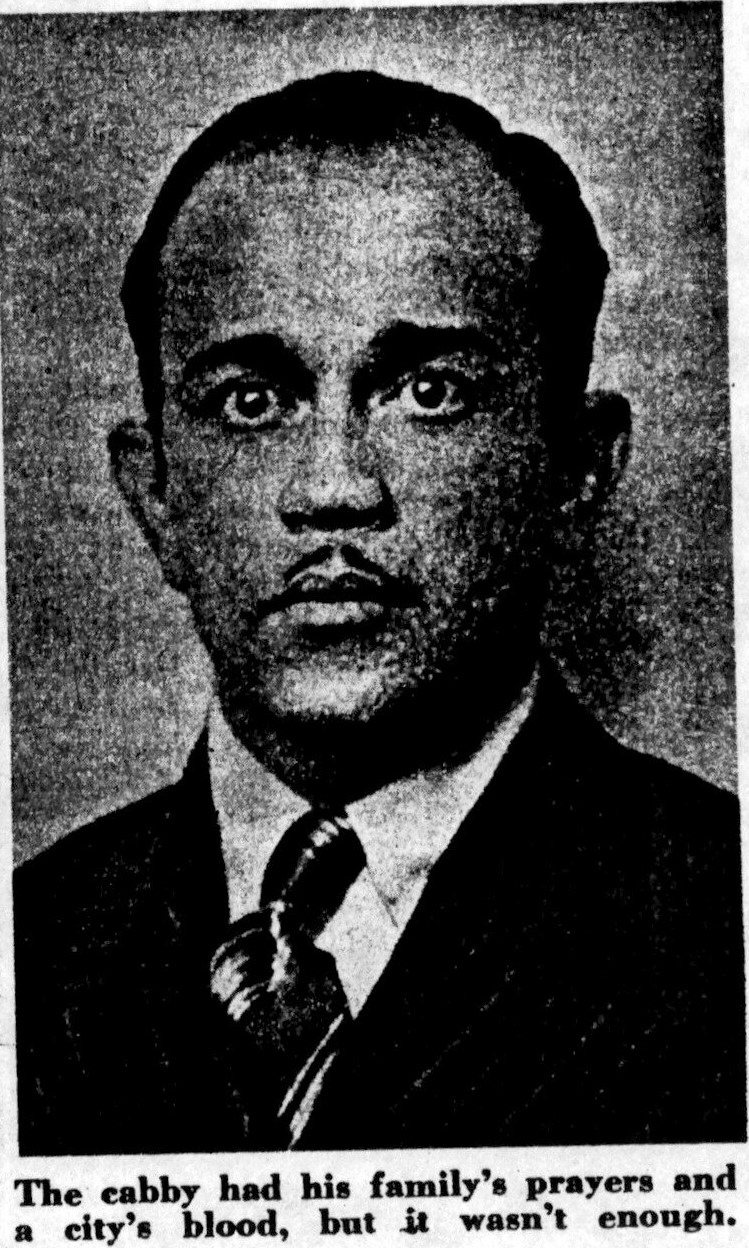
A photograph of David Suro, provided by the family

About a month after the Von Gunten killing, the New York City police were alerted that Keith might be residing in the city, as a recent wave of liquor store and service station robberies matched his modus operandi. They were informed to stake out an apartment in The Bronx, where his mother was living, believing that their fugitive might appear there. Unbeknownst to them, on December 19, a 49-year-old cab driver named David Suro was cruising around Harlem when he was hailed at Seventh Avenue. He picked up two men and two women: one of the men was referred to as "Frisco Keith" by his companions.

While driving through the heavy traffic and reaching Webster Avenue, the two men took out guns and told Suro that this was a stick-up. Noticing that there was a police car parked nearby, the driver crashed the taxi into them, causing the robbers to exit. Keith fired two shots at Suro while exiting, hitting him in the chest and abdomen.

Shortly after, Leroy Keith was engaged in hot pursuit by a multitude of patrolmen throughout the crowded streets, both sides exchanging gunfire but miraculously avoiding any civilian casualties. Keith was eventually cornered at a parked car and surrounded by five officers. Refusing to back down, he fired four times, but missed each shot. In response, Sgt. Richard Boland and officer James J. Connelly returned fire, with five of the bullets hitting the murderer in the chest, midsection and legs, effectively immobilizing him.

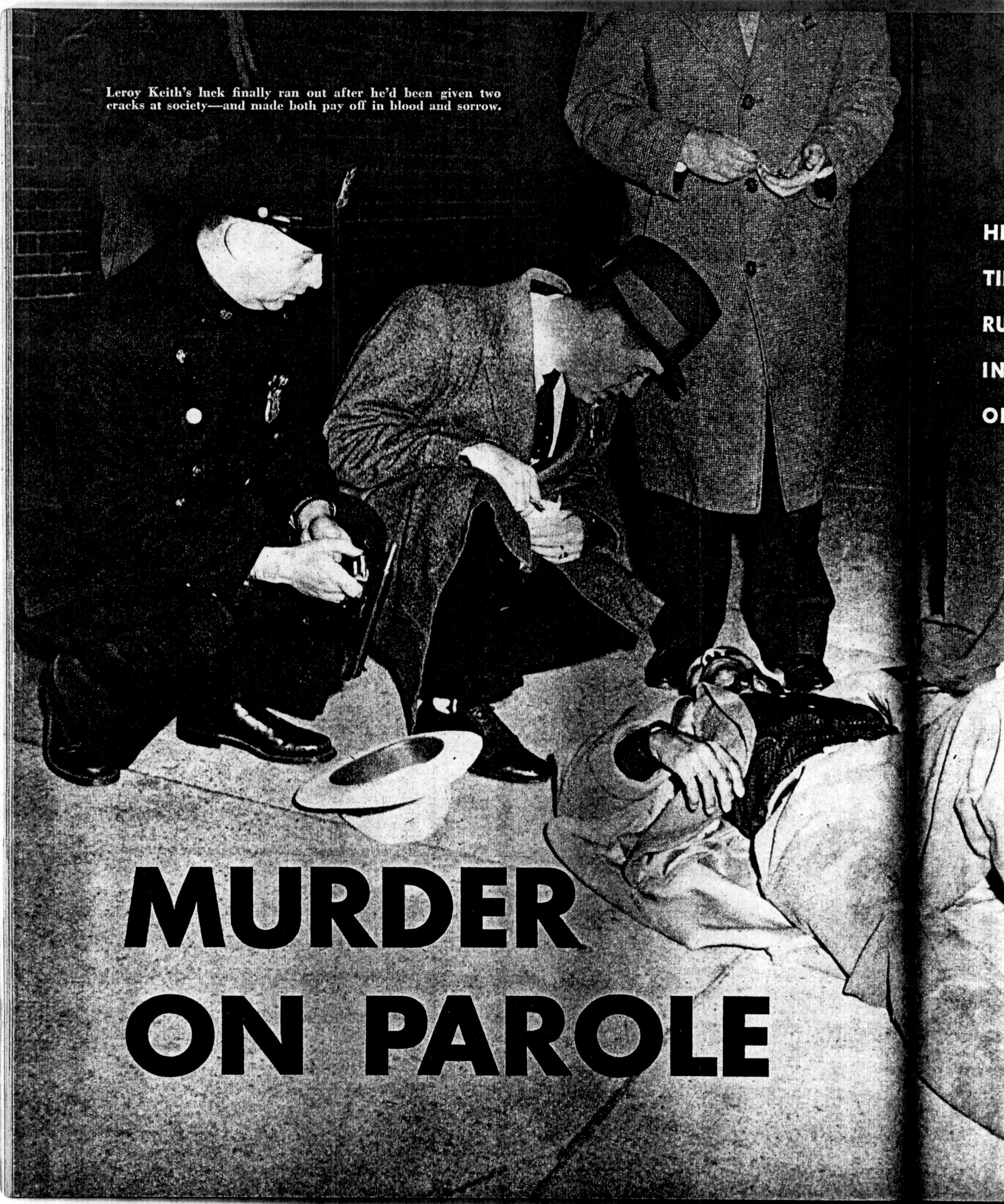
Detectives surrounding Keith following his capture

Keith and Suro were driven to Fordham Hospital, while the police handled the remaining accomplices in the botched robbery. The other man, 22-year-old James T. Morris of Riverheard, was arrested soon after, as well as the two women. Suro died the following day from his injuries. Meanwhile, Keith, who had to undertake an operation to remove the bullets from his body, fiercely resisted and swore at the doctors.

Despite his protests, he was restrained and the slugs successfully removed, saving his life. Not long after receiving the news that they had captured their fugitive, detectives from Akron were dispatched to question Keith, who refused to cooperate with them. As a sign of their gratitude for Suro's heroic act, the $2,500 award for Keith's capture was given to the deceased's widow.

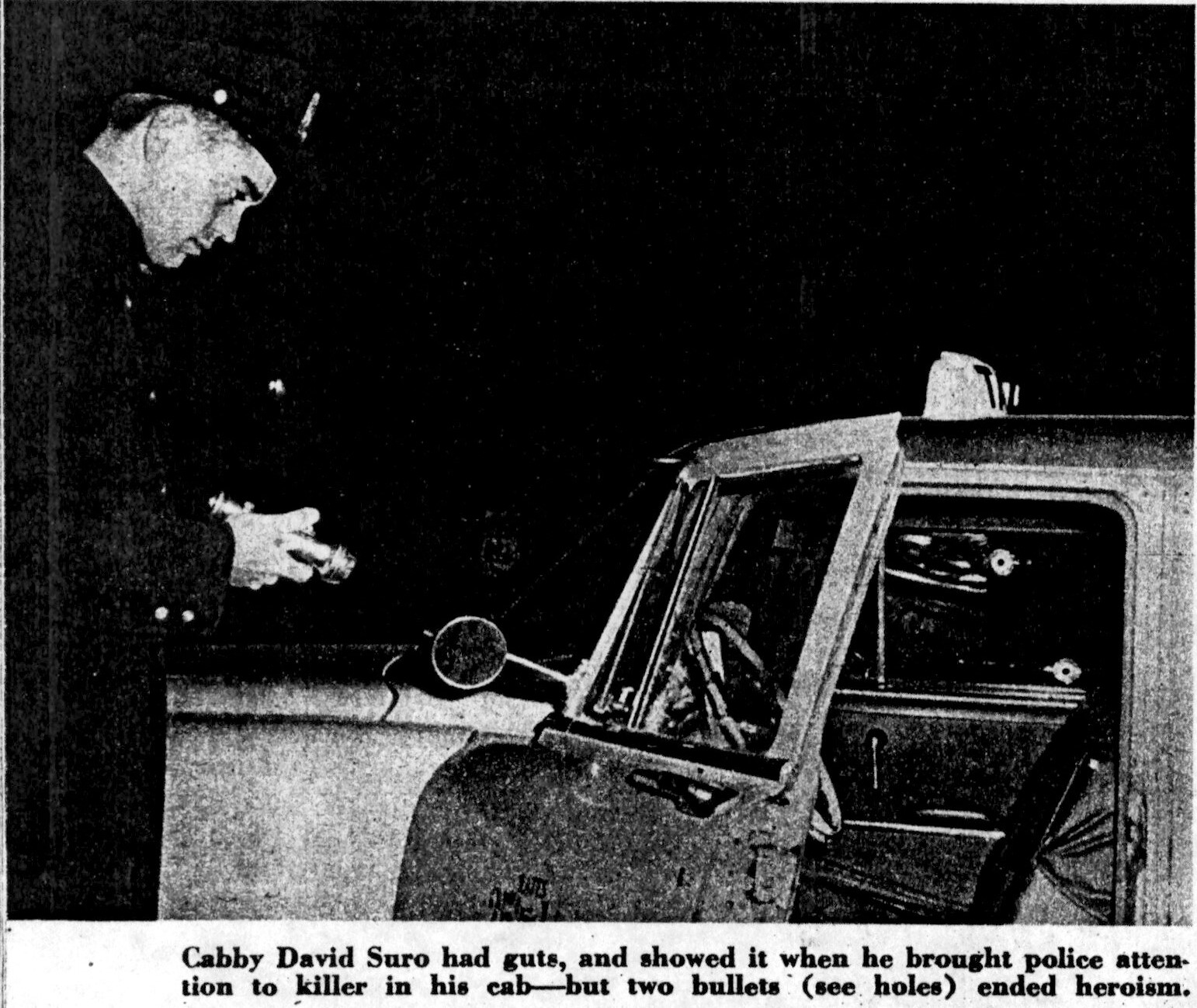
Detectives examining the Suro crime scene

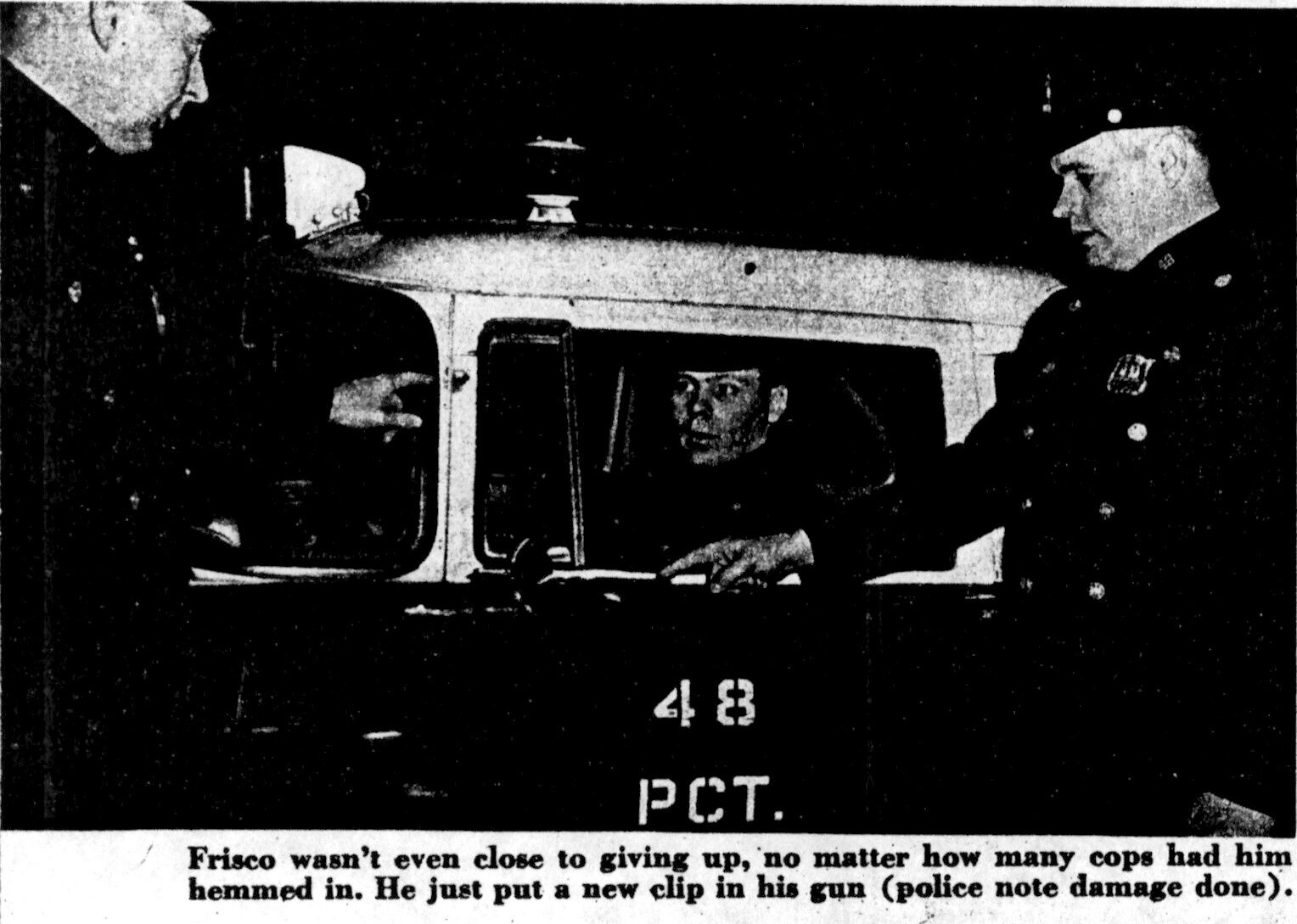
Inspection of damage done to the vehicle

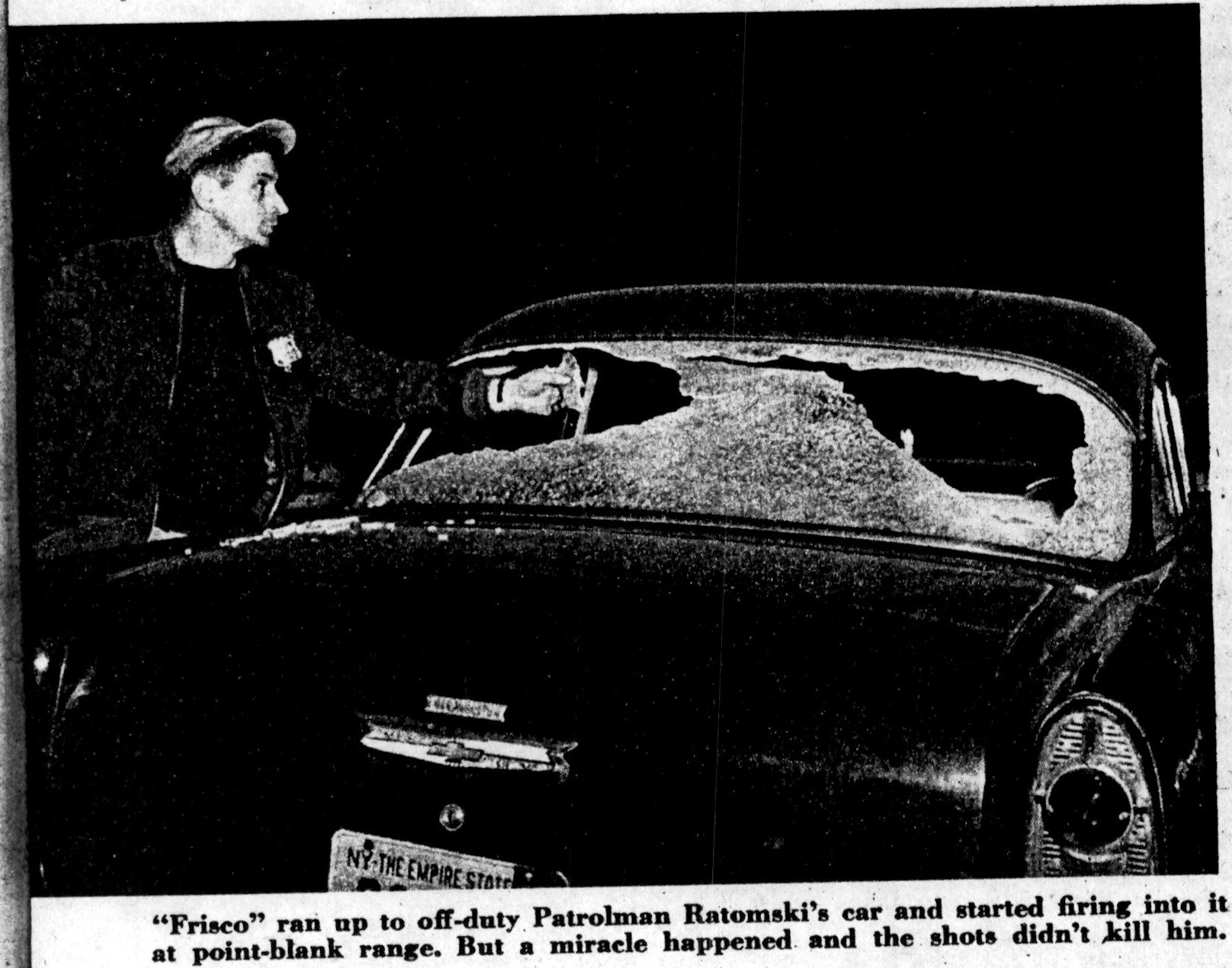
Patrolman Joseph Ratomski's cruiser; David Suro crashed into it in order to prevent the stick-up

== Trial, imprisonment and execution ==
After spending the majority of 1957 recovering from his injuries and undergoing mental examinations, Leroy Keith was brought to trial in January 1958. After 13 days, he was found guilty by a jury verdict, and sentenced to death. Keith was sent to Sing Sing to await execution, where, during the 18 months he spent there, he was not visited by anybody.

His execution was delayed twice by Governors Nelson Rockefeller and Malcolm Wilson after him. In the end, the date was set for July 23, 1959. After he walked in the execution room, Leroy Keith's last reported words were: "Sooner or later, we all come to justice. I was disappointed in Governor Rockefeller." He was then strapped to the electric chair, and summarily executed. The news of his death and his crimes were reported in the local news.

== See also ==
- Capital punishment in New York (state)
- List of people executed in New York
- List of people executed in the United States in 1959
- List of serial killers in the United States

== Bibliography ==
- Front Page Detective, April 1957 Issue, by Calvin E. Dewey
