= West Virginia Penitentiary =

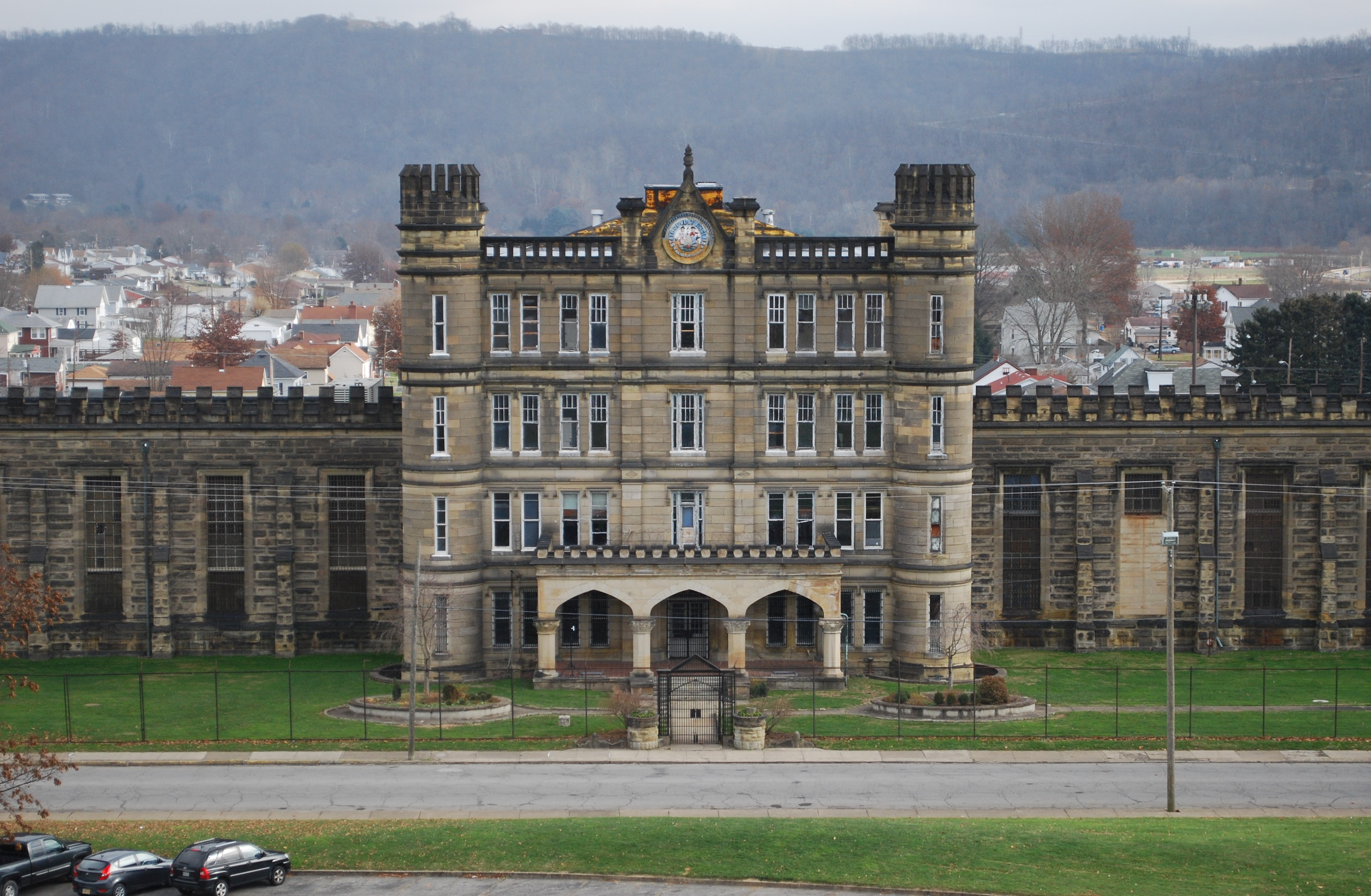
- The penitentiary

General information
- Type: Prison
- Architectural style: Gothic architecture
- Location: Moundsville, West Virginia, 818 Jefferson Avenue
- Coordinates: 39.91649°N 80.742368°W
- Current tenants: Moundsville Economic Development Council
- Construction started: 1866
- Completed: 1876
- Cost: $363,061

References
- West Virginia State Penitentiary
- U.S. National Register of Historic Places
- U.S. Historic district
- Location within West Virginia Location within the United States
- Location: 818 Jefferson Ave., Moundsville, West Virginia
- Area: 19 acres (7.7 ha)
- Built: 1866
- Architectural style: Gothic Revival
- NRHP reference No.: 96000987
- Added to NRHP: September 19, 1996

The West Virginia Penitentiary, located in Moundsville, West Virginia is now a withdrawn and retired gothic-style prison that operated from 1866 to 1995. The site is now being maintained as a tourist attraction, museum, training facility, and filming location.

== Design ==
The Penitentiary's design is similar to the facility at the 1858 state prison in Joliet, Illinois, with its castellated Gothic, stone structure, complete with turrets and battlements, except it is scaled down to half the size. The original architectural designs have been lost in translation. The original wall along Jefferson Avenue is approximately 826 feet (252 m) long. The walls were constructed on foundations extending 6 feet (1.8 m) below ground, were 6 feet (1.8 m) wide at the base and 24 feet (7.3 m) high, tapering to 18 inches (460 mm) at the top. The center tower section is 682 feet (208 m) long. It lies at the western side of the complex along Jefferson Avenue and is considered the front, as this is where the main entrance is located. The walls here are 24 feet (7.3 m) high and 6 feet (1.8 m) wide at the base, tapering to 18 inches (460 mm) towards the top.

== History ==
=== Founding ===
West Virginia became a state in 1863 during the American Civil War. At the time, county jails were used to incarcerate prisoners. Beginning in 1864, the West Virginia Legislature directed Governor Arthur I. Boreman to confine people convicted of felonies in the Ohio County jail in Wheeling. In 1866, the legislature directed the Board of Public Works to select a site of at least 10 acres in or near Moundsville for a state penitentiary and appropriated $50,000 for the purchase of land and the beginning of construction.

North Hall had a kitchen, dining area, hospital, and chapel. The four-story Administration Building connected the north and south wings. The warden and his family lived on the fourth floor of the Administration Building while female inmates were housed on the third floor. The penitentiary was completed in 1876.

=== Operation ===
In the early 1900s some industries within the prison walls included a carpentry shop, a paint shop, a wagon shop, a stone yard, a brick yard, a blacksmith, a tailor a bakery, and a hospital. Revenue from the prison farm and inmate labor helped make the prison virtually self-sufficient. A prison coal mine located a mile away, opened in 1921, supplying coal to the penitentiary and saving the state an estimated $14,000 a year. Some inmates were allowed to stay at the mine's camp under the supervision of a mine foreman, who was not a prison employee.

Conditions at the prison during the turn of the 20th century were good, according to a warden's report, which stated that, "both the quantity and the quality of all the purchases of material, food and clothing have been very gradually, but steadily, improved, while the discipline has become more nearly perfect and the exaction of labor less stringent. Education was a priority for the inmates during this time and they even regularly attended class. Construction of a school and library was completed in 1900 to help reform and educate inmates.

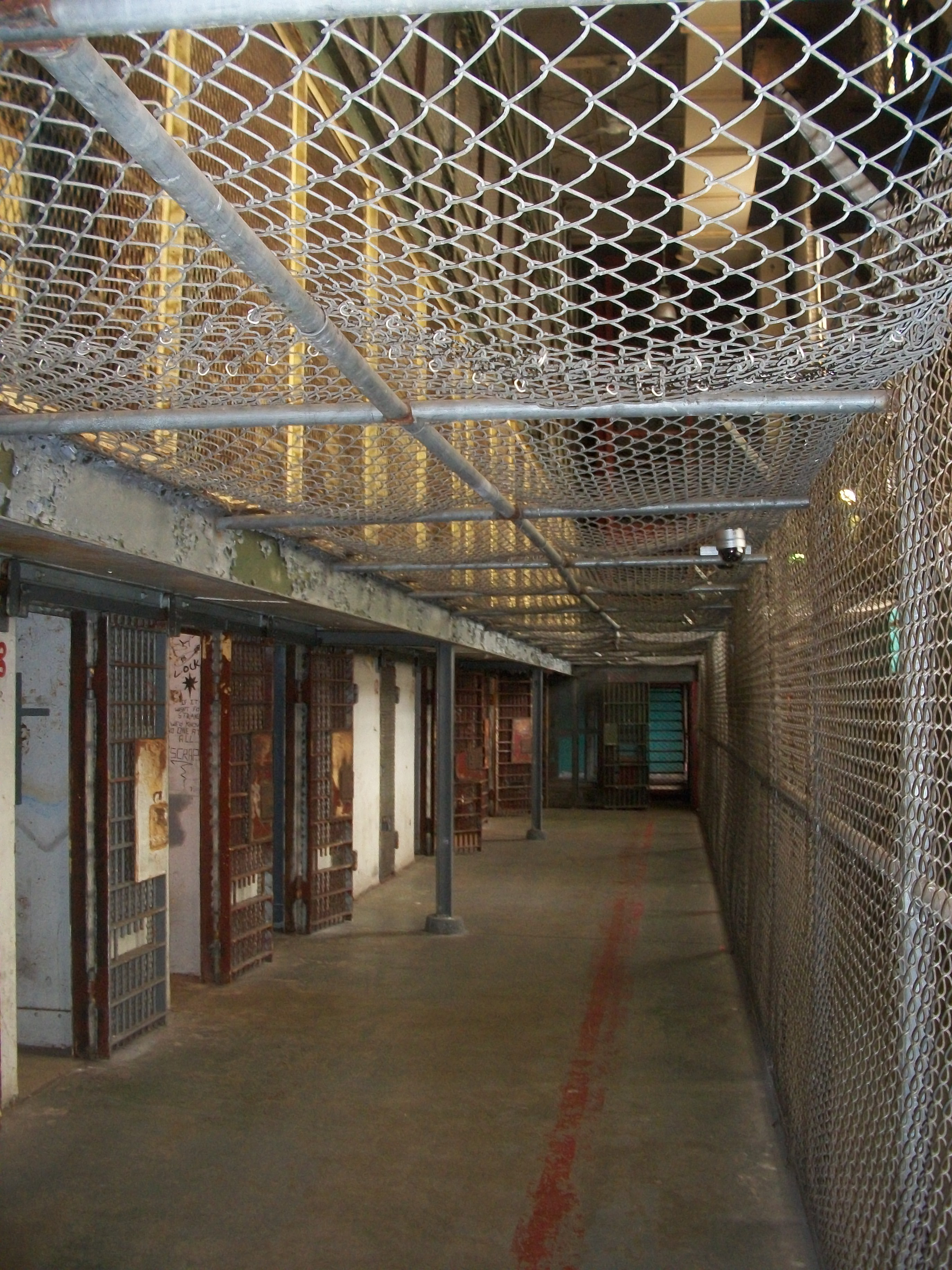
Cells where the prison's worst inmates were kept.

However, the conditions at the prison worsened through the years, and the facility would be ranked on the United States Department of Justice's Top Ten Most Violent Correctional Facilities list. A recreation room known as the "Sugar Shack," became notorious for gambling, fighting, and sexual assaults.

Labor activist Eugene V. Debs was imprisoned at the penitentiary from April 13 to June 14, 1919, before being transferred to the United States Penitentiary in Atlanta following his conviction under the Espionage Act of 1917.

By the 1920s, the penitentiary held more than 2,000 inmates and experienced severe overcrowding. Construction of a new wing, later known as the ‘New Wall,’ began in 1929. The expansion was completed in 1959.

In 1983, convicted multiple murderer Charles Manson requested a transfer from a California prison to the West Virginia Penitentiary, citing his desire to be closer to family in the area. His mother had been an inmate of the prison during Manson's childhood. Warden Donald Bordenkircher denied the request.

=== 1979 Prison break ===
On November 7, 1979, fifteen prisoners escaped from the prison. One of the escapees was Ronald Turney Williams, who was serving a sentence for the 1975 murder of Beckley Police Sergeant David Lily. During the escape, Williams encountered 23-year-old off-duty West Virginia State Trooper Philip S. Kesner, who was driving past the penitentiary with his wife. Kesner attempted to intervene, and Williams shot him. Despite being mortally wounded, Kesner exchanged fire.

Williams remained at large until June 1981 and was added to the FBI's Ten Most Wanted Fugitives list on April 16, 1980. While a fugitive, Williams was accused of murdering John Bunchek during a robbery in Scottsdale, Arizona. Williams was captured after a shootout with federal agents at the George Washington Hotel in New York City in June 1981. Williams was later convicted in Arizona for murdering John Bunchek and was sentenced to death in 1984.

=== 1986 Riot ===
January 1, 1986, was the date of inmates at the West Virginia Penitentiary began an uprising which became known as the New Years Day Riot. Overcrowding remained a serious issue at the prison.

At around 5:30 p.m, twenty inmates, known as a group called the "Avengers", stormed the mess hall where Captain Glassock and others were on duty. "Within seconds. Glassock, five other officers, and a food-service worker were taken hostage, threatened with knives, and handcuffed. Although several hostages were taken throughout the day, none of them were seriously injured. Three inmates were killed during the two day riot. Danny Lehman, president of the Avengers, emerged as the inmates' principal negotiator with authorities and spokesperson to the media. Lehman was not among the 20 inmates who initially began the riot. Governor Arch A. Moore Jr. met with inmates during the riot.

=== Executions ===
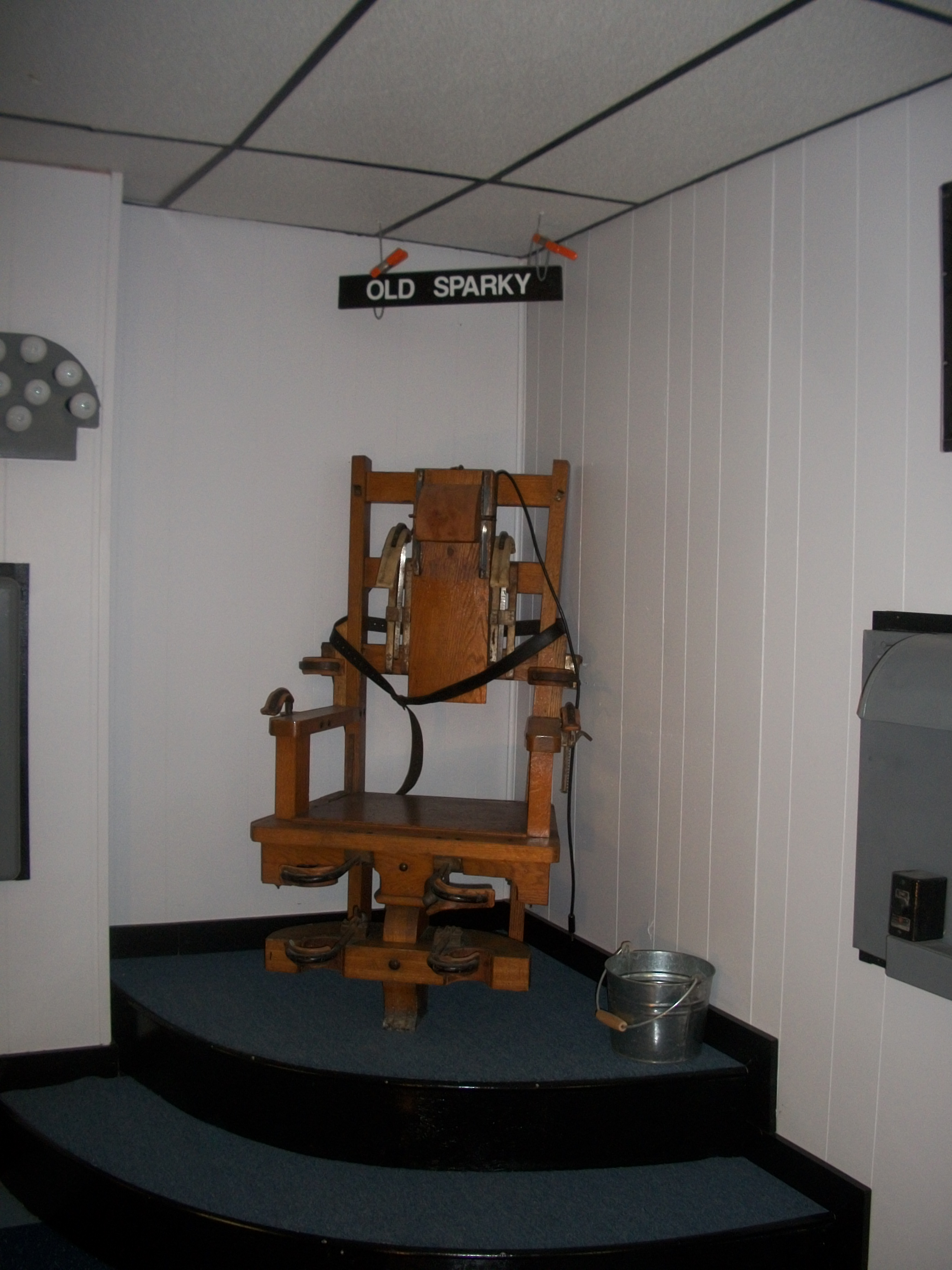
The original Old Sparky on display

From 1899 to 1959, ninety-four men were executed at the prison. Of the 94 executions carried out at the penitentiary, 85 were by hanging and nine were by electrocution. On June 19, 1931, Frank Hyer was executed by hanging on June 19, 1931. Bud Peterson was executed by hanging at the penitentiary on February 25, 1949.

Beginning in 1951, electrocution became the means of execution. The electric chair used by the prison, nicknamed "Old Sparky" was originally built by an inmate there, Paul Glenn. The last execution carried out in the state's electric chair was that of Elmer Bruner on April 3, 1959. Nine men were electrocuted before the state prohibited capital punishment entirely in 1965. The original chair is on display in the facility and is included in the official tour.

=== Decommissioning ===
At one time the penitentiary housed more than 2,000 inmates. In 1986, the Supreme Court of Appeals of West Virginia ruled that, given the conditions at the penitentiary, continued confinement in its 35-square-foot cells constituted cruel and unusual punishment. The West Virginia Penitentiary closed on March 27, 1995. The inmates were transferred to the Mt. Olive Correctional Complex in West Virginia. The Northern Regional Jail and Correctional Facility opened in Marshall County in 1994.

== Training ==
In 1997, the Division of Corrections leased the former penitentiary to the Moundsville Economic Development Council for 25 years. The penitentiary is used for law-enforcement and corrections training, including the annual Mock Prison Riot.

== Appearances in media ==
The prison has been featured in a variety of media such as books, films, television shows, songs and video games.

=== Novels ===
Moundsville native Davis Grubb used his hometown and the surrounding area as the setting for his 1953 novel The Night of the Hunter. The novel was adapted into a 1955 film directed by Charles Laughton, with a screenplay credited to James Agee.

=== Film/TV ===
The West Virginia Penitentiary served as the fictional "Glory Prison." In the 1971 film adaptation of Fools' Parade. The Night of the Hunter was adapted into a film by Charles Laughton and James Agee in 1955. Fools' Parade, starring James Stewart, Kurt Russell, and George Kennedy, was adapted into a film.

Prison scenes in the 2013 film Out of the Furnace were filmed on site at the penitentiary.

The West Virginia Penitentiary was the location of the pilot episode for MTV's paranormal reality television series Fear in Season 1 Episode 1.

The West Virginia Penitentiary was used as the fictional Shawshank State Prison in the Hulu series Castle Rock. The Ohio State Reformatory in Mansfield, Ohio was used for the 1994 movie The Shawshank Redemption.

The West Virginia Penitentiary was used for exterior shots in the Netflix series Mindhunter, representing the Joliet Correctional Center in Illinois.

The West Virginia Penitentiary was featured in the 2018 Most Terrifying Places in America episode "Cursed Towns" on the Travel Channel.

The West Virginia penitentiary was featured in the Mysteries of the Abandoned episode “American Ghost Park,” which aired on the Science Channel on November 14, 2019.

The 2025 film Time of Death was shot in the penitentiary and nearby locations.

=== Music ===
West Virginia Penitentiary features in American songwriter Mark Kozelek and Jimmy Lavalle's song "You Missed my Heart", which ends with refrain: "Down river from the Moundsville prison graveyard."

=== Video games ===
West Virginia Penitentiary is a location in the game Fallout 76, renamed “Eastern Regional Penitentiary” and relocated to southeast Grafton.

== See also ==
- List of Registered Historic Places in West Virginia
