= Capital punishment in West Virginia =

Capital punishment was abolished in the U.S. state of West Virginia in 1965.

Prior to secession from the Confederacy and admission to the Union on June 20, 1863, West Virginia was a part of Virginia. Under Virginia's authority, 43 people were executed; there were 112 executions after West Virginia achieved statehood.

The first two people executed in the State of West Virginia were Daniel Grogan and Thomas Boice, both convicted of murder and hanged in Wood County in 1866. After West Virginia became a state, no women were executed there. Hanging was an official method until 1949.

In 1949, West Virginia became the last state to adopt the electric chair as its only means of execution. The first two inmates electrocuted were 29-year-old Harry Burdette and 32-year-old Fred Painter on March 26, 1951. Then-State Delegate Robert Byrd was among the official witnesses during their executions. Byrd recalled this event, stating "It's not a beautiful thing."

Until 1959, 102 people were hanged, nine electrocuted and one hung in chains.

The last person executed by West Virginia was Elmer Bruner on April 3, 1959, for the robbery-murder of Ruby Miller committed with the claw-end of a hammer in Huntington.

No federal executions have taken place in West Virginia, but two were sentenced to death in 2007, George Lecco and Valerie Friend, for the murder of an informant who was supplying federal law enforcement with information about the couple's cocaine drug ring. Those verdicts and sentences were overturned in 2009 due to juror misconduct, and the retrials ended with life without parole and 35 years for Lecco and Friend respectively.

Along with Iowa, West Virginia became the final pre-Furman state to abolish capital punishment in 1965.

2024 saw two bills to reinstate the death penalty. One was for attacks on first responders and one for selling fentanyl.

In February 2026, a Bill reinstating capital punishment for child murder and rape (both in the first-degree) was passed by the Senate Judiciary Committee, and was pending review and approval by the Senate Finance Committee. The bill, however, did not materialize by the stipulated deadline. In September 2026, Senator Brian Helton expressed his intent to reinstate the death penalty for felony sexual battery against children aged below 12, and attempted sexual battery that led to injury of the victim's sexual organs, and proposed a bill.

== See also ==
- List of people executed in West Virginia
- Crime in West Virginia
