= Killeen shooting =

Killeen shooting may refer to:

- Luby's shooting (1991)
- 2009 Fort Hood shooting
- 2014 Fort Hood shootings
