= List of Fort Hood shooting victims =

List of Fort Hood shooting victims may refer to:

- 2009 Fort Hood shooting § Casualties, victims of a shooting in November 2009
- Victims of the 2014 Fort Hood shootings, a shooting in April 2014
