= Fort Hood shooting =

Fort Hood shooting may refer to:

- 2009 Fort Hood shooting, which left thirteen people dead and 33 others injured
- 2014 Fort Hood shootings, which left four people dead and 14 others injured
