= Naser Jason Abdo =

American soldier and convict (born 1990)

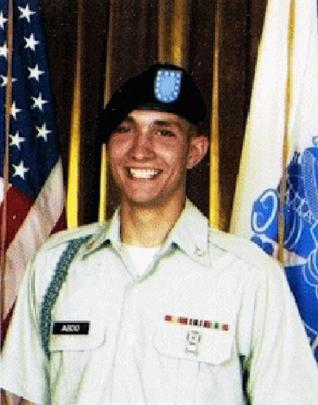
- Abdo in his U.S. Army uniform
- Born: April 1, 1990 (age 36); Garland, Texas, U.S.
- Occupation: Soldier
- Status: Incarcerated
- Convictions: Attempted murder of a federal employee Attempted use of a weapon of mass destruction Possession of a weapon during a crime of violence (4 counts)
- Penalty: 2 life sentences without the possibility of parole

Details
- Imprisoned at: ADX Florence

Naser Jason Abdo (born April 1, 1990) is an American former United States Army private first class who was arrested in 2011 for attempting to commit a terrorist attack against a restaurant frequented by soldiers from Fort Hood, Texas. He was convicted in federal court and sentenced to two consecutive life terms, plus 60 years, which he is currently serving in ADX Florence.

Abdo joined the U.S. Army in 2009, but applied for conscientious objector status the following year. Army officials approved his application, but the process was put on hold when child pornography was discovered on his government-issued computer, and the Army suggested he be court-martialed. Abdo denied the charges and went AWOL from Fort Campbell, Kentucky over the Independence Day weekend. After a series of suspicious purchases, authorities located bomb-making materials in his hotel room and arrested him on July 28, 2011.

Abdo is alleged to have planned the bombing because of his opposition as a Muslim to harming other Muslims during the war in Afghanistan. He was charged for a bomb plot, not terrorism, as he acted alone and was not part of a terrorist organization.

== Early life ==
Abdo was born in Garland, Texas, 13 miles (21 km) northeast of Dallas. His mother is an American Christian, and his father is a Palestinian–Jordanian Muslim. When Naser was three, his parents divorced, and he lived most of his childhood with his father. In Garland, he attended Richardson Terrace Elementary School, South Garland High School and Berkner High School. According to Abdo's 2010 statement to the Army, at the age of 17, he began practicing Islam. The following year, he took classes in mass communication at the American University in Dubai.

His father lived for about 25 years in the United States. After being convicted in 2006 of soliciting a minor over the internet, the senior Abdo served three years of a five-year sentence in the Texas Department of Criminal Justice before being deported back to Jordan in 2010.

== Army ==
With no job prospects, soon before his 19th birthday, Abdo joined the United States Army in March 2009. At the time of the Fort Hood shootings later that year, he condemned the actions of Nidal Malik Hasan, who was arrested and charged in the case.

Abdo's brigade from Fort Campbell, Kentucky, was deployed to Afghanistan in February 2010. Abdo stayed behind to continue authorized studies in language school to learn Pashto, one of the predominant languages in the region. He was due to deploy to Afghanistan in June 2010, but applied that spring for conscientious objector status. He said the prospect of deployment had forced him to examine his beliefs, and as a Muslim he could not serve in Afghanistan against Muslim peoples. In an interview with Al Jazeera TV, which aired on August 21, 2010 (as translated by MEMRI), Abdo said, "I don't believe I can involve myself in an army that wages war against Muslims. I don't believe I could sleep at night if I take part, in any way, in the killing of a Muslim." The Army approved his discharge, but it was put on hold when Army officials discovered child pornography on his government-issued computer while processing him out.

At a June 15 hearing, Army officials recommended that Abdo be court-martialed. After being charged with possessing child pornography, which he denied, Abdo went AWOL from Fort Campbell during the Independence Day weekend in 2011.

In the spring, two anti-war groups, Iraq Veterans Against the War and Courage to Resist, had initially supported Abdo's conscientious objector bid. In a statement for Iraq Veterans Against the War, Abdo had written, "Only when the military and America can disassociate Muslims from terror can we move onto a brighter future of religious collaboration and dialogue that defines America and makes me proud to be an American." After Abdo's arrest, a spokesman for Iraq Veterans condemned the planned attack, saying it was utterly against their principles. Upon learning of Abdo's arrest on the child pornography charges, Courage to Resist, which had contributed to Abdo's legal fees in the conscientious objector case, said in a statement that it had removed his profile from its website and no longer supported him.

== Arrest ==
On July 27, 2011, the staff of the Guns Galore gun store in Killeen, Texas, near Fort Hood, noted that Abdo bought an unusually large amount of smokeless gunpowder, three boxes of shotgun ammunition, and a magazine for a pistol. A clerk notified the Killeen Police Department, which tracked Abdo to the Best Value Inn and Suites. Coincidentally, Guns Galore was the store in which Nidal Malik Hasan bought the FN Five-seven pistol used in the 2009 Fort Hood shooting, as well as the store where the killer in the 2014 Fort Hood shootings allegedly bought his pistol.

In Abdo's hotel room, police found a handgun and the ingredients for an improvised explosive device, including gunpowder, shrapnel, and pressure cookers. Also in the room was an article entitled "Make a bomb in the kitchen of your Mom" from Inspire magazine, the English-language publication of al-Qaeda. According to Daniel Pipes of The Washington Times, the "materials in Pfc. Abdo's possession corresponded precisely to the 'ingredients' listed in the Inspire magazine article on bomb-making." Abdo had also purchased a uniform with Fort Hood patches from a military surplus store to fit in with local soldiers.

== Court hearing and sentencing ==
In a court hearing on July 29, 2011, Abdo was charged with possession of an unregistered destructive device. He did not enter a plea at that time. He was ordered held without bond. While leaving the courtroom, Abdo shouted "Nidal Hasan, Fort Hood 2009" in reference to Nidal Hasan, the perpetrator of the 2009 Fort Hood shooting. Abdo also invoked the name of Abeer Qassim al-Janabi, a 14-year-old girl raped and murdered by U.S. Army soldiers in Iraq, for which five soldiers were charged and convicted.

According to court papers, Abdo "admitted that he planned to assemble two bombs in the hotel room using gun powder and shrapnel packed into pressure cookers" to explode at a restaurant popular with soldiers. After hearing testimony from the Federal Bureau of Investigation in February 2012, the federal judge stated that Abdo could be indicted on additional charges. He represented himself in court and again denied that he had possessed child pornography.

On May 24, 2012, Abdo was found guilty in federal court of attempted use of a weapon of mass destruction, attempted murder of federal employees, possession of a weapon in furtherance of a federal crime of violence, and possession of a firearm in furtherance of a federal crime of violence. On August 10, 2012, Abdo was sentenced to two life terms plus 60 years in prison. He is currently being held at ADX Florence.

The U.S. attorney in the case, Robert L. Pitman, compared the plot to the 2012 Aurora theater shooting and the Wisconsin Sikh temple shooting, as an example of Americans who planned to "use violence to advance their twisted agenda".
