= Pinheads and Patriots =

2010 book by Bill O'Reilly

Pinheads and Patriots: Where You Stand in the Age of Obama
- Author: Bill O'Reilly
- Language: English
- Genre: Non-Fiction
- Publisher: William Morrow
- Publication date: September 14, 2010
- Publication place: United States
- Media type: Print (Hardback), Kindle, Audio
- Pages: 272 (Hardcover)
- ISBN: 0-06-195071-8
- OCLC: 555673195
- LC Class: PN

Pinheads and Patriots: Where You Stand in the Age of Obama is a book by American journalist Bill O'Reilly, published in 2010.

== Content ==
The premise of Pinheads & Patriots is taken from a segment on O’Reilly’s talk show, “The Factor,” during which he called out "people who are doing good things (patriots), and those who are doing awful, dumb or evil things (pinheads)". In the book, O’Reilly tries to be more precise about these terms. He defines a pinhead as someone who lacks intelligence or common sense. The term applies to individual actions, but O’Reilly warns that “Pinhead status is a slippery slope. Get in with the wrong crowd, get taken by your own success, or get some bad advice, and all of that can lead to residence in Pinheadville.” By way of contrast, “Patriotism is not short, frenzied outbursts of emotion, but the tranquil and steady dedication of a lifetime.”

The book focuses on Barack Obama's first 18 months in office and how he and his government managed various events, such as the Deepwater Horizon oil spill and the 2009 Fort Hood shooting. O'Reilly analyses the actions taken and gives his opinion on whether they were handled in a "Patriotic" or "Pinhead" manner.

== Resurgence and Internet Meme Status ==
The book has seen a considerable rise in popularity starting in July 2020 when Far-right streamer Nick Fuentes mentioned it during the superchat segment of his show America First, a political commentary show he hosts on weeknights. Since then, the book has been subject to ridicule and the terminology has been used to mock neoconservatives like O'Reilly. Supreme Court justice Neil Gorsuch has also been targeted by the meme, with Fuentes stating, "We needed a patriot but got a pinhead.”
