= Suzanna Hupp =

American politician

Suzanna Gratia Hupp
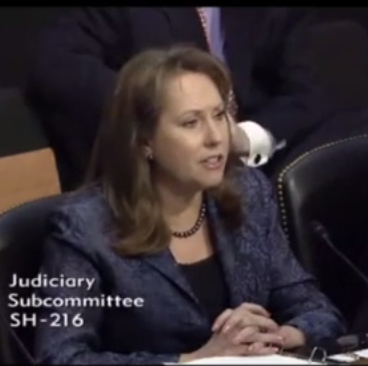
- Hupp testifying before the Senate Judiciary Committee on February 12, 2013

Texas State Representative for District 54 (Bell, Burnet, and Lampasas counties)
- In office 1997–2007
- Preceded by: Layton Black
- Succeeded by: Jimmie Don Aycock

Personal details
- Born: September 28, 1959 (age 67) Friendswood, Texas
- Party: Republican
- Spouse: Gregory Scott "Greg" Hupp
- Children: Alexander Hupp, Ethan Hupp
- Parent(s): Al and Ursula "Suzy" Kunath Gratia
- Occupation: Chiropractor

Suzanna Gratia Hupp (born September 28, 1959) is a Republican former state representative, who represented from 1997 to 2007 District 54 in central Texas, which encompasses Bell, Burnet, and Lampasas counties.

After surviving the 1991 shooting at the former Luby's Cafeteria in Killeen, Texas, Hupp became a leading advocate of an individual's right to carry a concealed weapon. Hupp was elected to her first of five consecutive terms in 1996. She did not seek a sixth two-year term in 2006. She has written a book, From Luby's to the Legislature: One Woman's Fight Against Gun Control, published by Privateer Publications in San Antonio, Texas.

== Background ==
The daughter of Alphonse "Al" and Ursula "Suzy" Kunath Gratia, Suzanna Hupp was reared in Friendswood, Texas, a city partly in Harris and Galveston counties in suburban Houston. She has an older brother, Allan Gratia, and a younger sister, Erika. She attended the University of Texas at El Paso and Texas Chiropractic College in Pasadena, from which she received a Doctor of Chiropractic degree in 1985.

Hupp moved first to Houston to practice and then in 1987 to Copperas Cove in Coryell County. She owned and operated the former Cove Physical Rehab Clinic from 1987 until 2000, when the facility was sold.

== Career ==
=== Surviving the Luby's massacre ===
Hupp and her parents were having lunch at the Luby's in Killeen in 1991, when a mass shooting took place. The gunman, George Hennard, shot forty-four people and killed twenty-four, including himself. The fatally wounded included both of Hupp's parents. Hupp later expressed regret about deciding to remove her gun from her purse and lock it in her car, lest she risk possibly running afoul of the state's concealed weapons laws; during the shootings, she reached for her weapon but then remembered that it was "a hundred feet away in my car." Her father, Al Gratia, who felt that he "needed to do something", tried to rush the gunman and was fatally shot in the chest. Seeing an escape route through a broken window (broken by the shoulder of another fleeing victim), Hupp grabbed her mother by the shirt and told her, "Come on, we have to go now!" As Hupp moved toward the only escape, she believed her mother was following her, only to find out later that Ursula had also been murdered, shot dead at point blank range while cradling her dying husband in her arms.

Hupp was 32 years old at the time of the shooting. As a survivor of the massacre, she testified across the country in support of concealed-handgun laws. Hupp said that had there been a second chance to prevent the slaughter, she would have violated the Texas state law and carried the handgun inside her purse into the restaurant that day. Had she done so, she may not have lost her parents. She also stated in her testimony that she would have taken a felony charge against her, rather than losing her parents through the tragedy, adding that those shouldn't be the choices, however, and that people should be able to defend themselves in an emergency without having to choose one over another. She testified across the country in support of concealed handgun laws and was elected to the Texas House of Representatives in 1996. The concealed-weapons bill was signed by then-Governor George W. Bush.

=== Election results, 1996 to 2004 ===
In the 1996 legislative election, the incumbent Democrat in the district, Layton Black, did not run again. Hupp's husband, Gregory Scott "Greg" Hupp (born 1969), was her campaign manager. She defeated Democratic nominee Dick Miller, 17,620 votes (52.8 percent) to 15,757 ballots (47.2 percent). At the time, the district included Bell and Lampasas counties but also the small populated counties of McCulloch, Mills, and San Saba. In 1998, Hupp defeated Democrat Don Armstrong, 11,954 votes (54.8 percent) to 9,866 ballots (45.2 percent). In 2000, she again defeated Armstrong, 23,139 (62.2 percent) to 14,084 (37.8 percent). The higher turnout reflected the presidential election year, when George W. Bush edged out Vice President Al Gore to claim the presidency. Hupp was unopposed in 2002. In 2004, she defeated the Democrat Edward Lindsay of Killeen, 28,907 votes (60.9 percent) to 18,594 votes. (39.1 percent), who later ran as well against her successor, Moderate Republican Jimmie Don Aycock, a veterinarian.

=== Appearances and accolades ===
Hupp has been quoted in such publications as U.S. News & World Report, The Wall Street Journal, Texas Monthly, and Time and People magazines. She was featured on CBS's 48 Hours series, on ABC's ABC World News Tonight with Charles Gibson, and in season 3, episode 9 of Penn & Teller: Bullshit!, a documentary series which aired from 2003 to 2010 on the television channel Showtime. Hupp can be heard in episode 81 of This American Life giving a first-hand account of her experience in the massacre.

In the state House, Hupp was a member of the House Rural Caucus and the House Veterans and Military Affairs Caucus. In November 2003, then Speaker Tom Craddick, a conservative from Midland and currently the longest-serving of all 150 Texas state House members, appointed Hupp to chair the House select committee on child welfare and foster care. Craddick also named her to chair the Human Services Committee in the 79th Legislature. She also served on the House Law Enforcement Committee.

According to Hupp, "How a politician stands on the Second Amendment tells you how he or she views you as an individual... as a trustworthy and productive citizen, or as part of an unruly crowd that needs to be lorded over, controlled, supervised, and taken care of." Hupp has hosted a radio talk program in the Greater Austin area. She is a co-founder of the Civil Liberties Defense Foundation, a non-profit legal foundation dedicated to providing educational information relating to the preservation of civil liberties guaranteed by the Bill of Rights to the United States Constitution and to providing legal services to protect those rights.

Hupp did not seek a sixth legislative term in 2006. Suzanna and Greg Hupp have two sons, Alexander and Ethan. The Hupps raise Arabian horses on a small ranch near Kempner in Lampasas County, Texas.
