= Luby's shooting =

1991 mass shooting in Texas, U.S.

Luby's massacre
- The scene at Luby's Cafeteria

- Location of Killeen, Texas
- Location: 31°05′37″N 97°43′26″W; Killeen, Texas, U.S.
- Date: October 16, 1991; 35 years ago 12:39 – 12:51 p.m. (CDT; UTC−05:00)
- Target: Women
- Attack type: Mass shooting; murder–suicide; shootout; mass murder; femicide; vehicle ramming attack
- Weapons: 1987 Ford Ranger; 9mm Glock 17 semi-automatic pistol; 9mm Ruger P89 semi-automatic pistol
- Deaths: 24 (15 women and 9 men including the perpetrator)
- Injuries: 27
- Perpetrator: George Pierre Hennard
- Motive: Misogyny

The Luby's shooting, also known as the Luby's massacre, was a mass shooting that took place on October 16, 1991 at a Luby's Cafeteria in Killeen, Texas, United States. The perpetrator, 35-year-old George Pierre Hennard, drove his pickup truck through the front window of the cafeteria before opening fire, killing 23 people and wounding 27 others. He had a brief shootout with police officers in which he was seriously wounded but refused their orders to surrender and eventually died by suicide.

The shooting was the deadliest mass shooting by a single perpetrator in modern U.S. history until it was surpassed in 2007 by the Virginia Tech shooting.

== Incident ==
On October 16, 1991, 35-year-old George Hennard, an unemployed former Merchant Marine seaman, drove a blue 1987 Ford Ranger pickup truck through the plate-glass front window of a Luby's Cafeteria in Killeen, Texas, at 12:39 p.m. October 16 was Boss's Day, and the cafeteria was unusually crowded with around 150 people. Hennard then began firing from inside the truck while holding Glock 17 and Ruger P89 pistols; the first victim was veterinarian Michael Griffith. Hennard exited the truck and yelled, "All women of Killeen and Belton are vipers! This is what you've done to me and my family! This is what Bell County did to me ...this is payback day!" He then opened fire on the patrons and staff with both pistols. Hennard then circled around the cafeteria, selectively picking his victims. He said "You bitch" to a woman before fatally shooting her.

Hennard saw another woman hiding underneath a bench near the serving line and said, "Hiding from me, bitch?" before shooting her dead. He then approached Steve Ernst, who was hiding underneath a table, before shooting him. Ernst then rolled over, holding his stomach. Hennard then approached a woman with a crying baby. He barked at her, saying, "You with the baby. Get out before I change my mind." She ran out, holding the baby in her arms. After she left, Hennard shot Ernst's wife in the arm. The bullet passed through and killed 70-year-old Venice Ellen Henehan, Ernst's mother-in-law.

During a brief lull in the shooting, Hennard approached the table of 28-year-old Tommy Vaughan in the rear of the cafeteria. Huddled on the floor beside a window, Vaughan threw himself through the window, creating an escape route for others. Dozens of people pushed, shoved, and knocked each other down as they made their escape. By the time police arrived a few minutes later, a third of them had managed to escape.

Hennard reloaded at least three times before police arrived and engaged in a brief shootout. Wounded, he retreated to an area between the two bathrooms (people were hiding in them and had blocked their doors). Police repeatedly ordered Hennard to surrender, but he refused, saying, "No, I'm going to kill more people." He was shot twice more by police, in the abdomen. Having depleted ammunition for one of his weapons and his injuries growing more severe, he committed suicide by shooting himself in the head with the final bullet. He had shot and killed 23 people—10 of them with single shots to the head at point blank range—and wounded another 27.

Hennard discharged his weapons about 80 times during the shooting, and police discharged their weapons about 30 times. Only Hennard was struck by police gunfire.

== Deaths ==
Victims of the shootings were:

Name	Age	Hometown
Patricia Carney	57	Belton
James "Jimmie" Caruthers	48	Austin
Kriemhild Davis	62	Killeen
LTC Steven Dody, USA	43	Copperas Cove/Fort Hood
Alphonse "Al" Gratia	71	Copperas Cove
Ursula Gratia	67	Copperas Cove
Debra Gray	33	Copperas Cove
Michael Griffith	48	Copperas Cove
Venice Henehan	70	Metz, Missouri
Clodine Humphrey	63	Marlin
Sylvia King	30	Killeen
Zona Lynn	65	Marlin
Constance "Connie" Peterson	41	Austin
Ruth Pujol	55	Copperas Cove
Su-Zann Rashott	36	Copperas Cove
John Romero Jr.	29	Copperas Cove
Thomas Simmons	33	Copperas Cove
Glen Arval Spivey	55	Harker Heights
Nancy Stansbury	44	Harker Heights
Olgica Taylor	45	Waco
James Welsh	75	Waco
Lula Welsh	75	Waco
Iva Juanita Williams	64	Temple

== Perpetrator ==
George Hennard

George Pierre Hennard (October 15, 1956 – October 16, 1991) was born in Sayre, Pennsylvania, into a wealthy family. Hennard was the son of a Swiss-born surgeon and a homemaker. He had two younger siblings, brother Alan and sister Desiree. From the age of 5, he moved with his family to various cities across the country as his father worked at several army hospitals. They settled in New Mexico, where his father worked at the White Sands Missile Range near Las Cruces.

After graduating from Mayfield High School in 1974, Hennard enlisted in the U.S. Navy and served for three years, until he was honorably discharged. He later worked as a merchant mariner, but was dismissed for drug use. Several months later, he enrolled in a drug treatment program in Houston, Texas.

Early in the investigation of the massacre, the Killeen police chief said that Hennard "had an evident problem with women for some reason". After his parents divorced in 1983, his father moved to Houston, and his mother moved to Henderson, Nevada. The Glock 17 and Ruger P89 9mm pistols which he used were purchased in February 1991 at Mike's Gun House in Henderson.

Hennard had begun to work at several different jobs, including construction crews in South Dakota and Killeen, while living part-time in Nevada with his mother. In Texas, he lived in a redbrick colonial home in Belton that his family had purchased in 1980 shortly after his father was hired at Fort Hood.

Hennard had stalked two women, sisters Jill Fritz, 23, and Jana Jemigan, 19, who lived two blocks away from him in his neighborhood. He sent them a five-page letter in June, part of which read: "Please give me the satisfaction of someday laughing in the face of all those mostly white treacherous female vipers from those two towns [Killeen and Belton] who tried to destroy me and my family" and "You think the three of us can get together some day?" He also wrote that he was "truly flattered knowing I have two teenage groupie fans".

=== Possible motive ===
Hennard was described as reclusive and belligerent, with an explosive temper. He was discharged from the Merchant Marine on May 11, 1989 for possession of marijuana and racial incidents. That same month, his seaman papers were suspended after he had a racial argument with another shipmate. Numerous reports included accounts of his expressed hatred of women. An ex-roommate of his said, "He hated blacks, Hispanics, gays. He said women were snakes and always had derogatory remarks about them, especially after fights with his mother." Survivors of the shootings later said he had passed over men to shoot women. Fifteen of the 23 murder victims (65%) were women, as were many of the wounded. He called two of the victims a "bitch" before shooting them.

In 1990, Hennard called Isaiah Williams, a port agent for the national maritime union in Wilmington, California, stating that he needed a letter of recommendation to regain his papers and rejoin the Merchant Marine. "I don't recall having given him one," Williams claimed. Hennard had learned in mid-February that his attempt to be reinstated had been denied. Several months later, he entered a drug-treatment program in Houston.

Around two months before the shooting, Hennard entered a convenience store in Belton to buy breakfast. Mary Mead, the clerk, claimed that he had leaned over the counter and said, "I want you to tell everybody, if they don't quit messing around my house, something awful is going to happen."

Hennard was obsessed with mass killers. He had a particular fascination with James Huberty, the perpetrator of the San Ysidro McDonald's massacre. Reportedly he studied the 1984 massacre extensively.

A week and a half before the shooting, Hennard collected his paycheck at a concrete company in Copperas Cove and announced he was quitting. He wondered aloud what would happen if he killed someone. "He got to talking about some of the people in Belton and certain women that had given him problems," coworker Bubba Hawkins claimed. "And he kept saying, 'Watch and see, watch and see'."

On his 35th birthday, October 15, 1991, Hennard spoke with his mother on the phone. Later that evening, while eating a cheeseburger and french fries at a diner outside of Belton, he had a sudden outburst of rage as he watched television coverage of Clarence Thomas' confirmation hearings. "When an interview with Anita Hill came on, he just went off," manager Bill Stringer said. "He started screaming, 'You bitch! You bastards opened the door for all the women!'"

== Aftermath ==
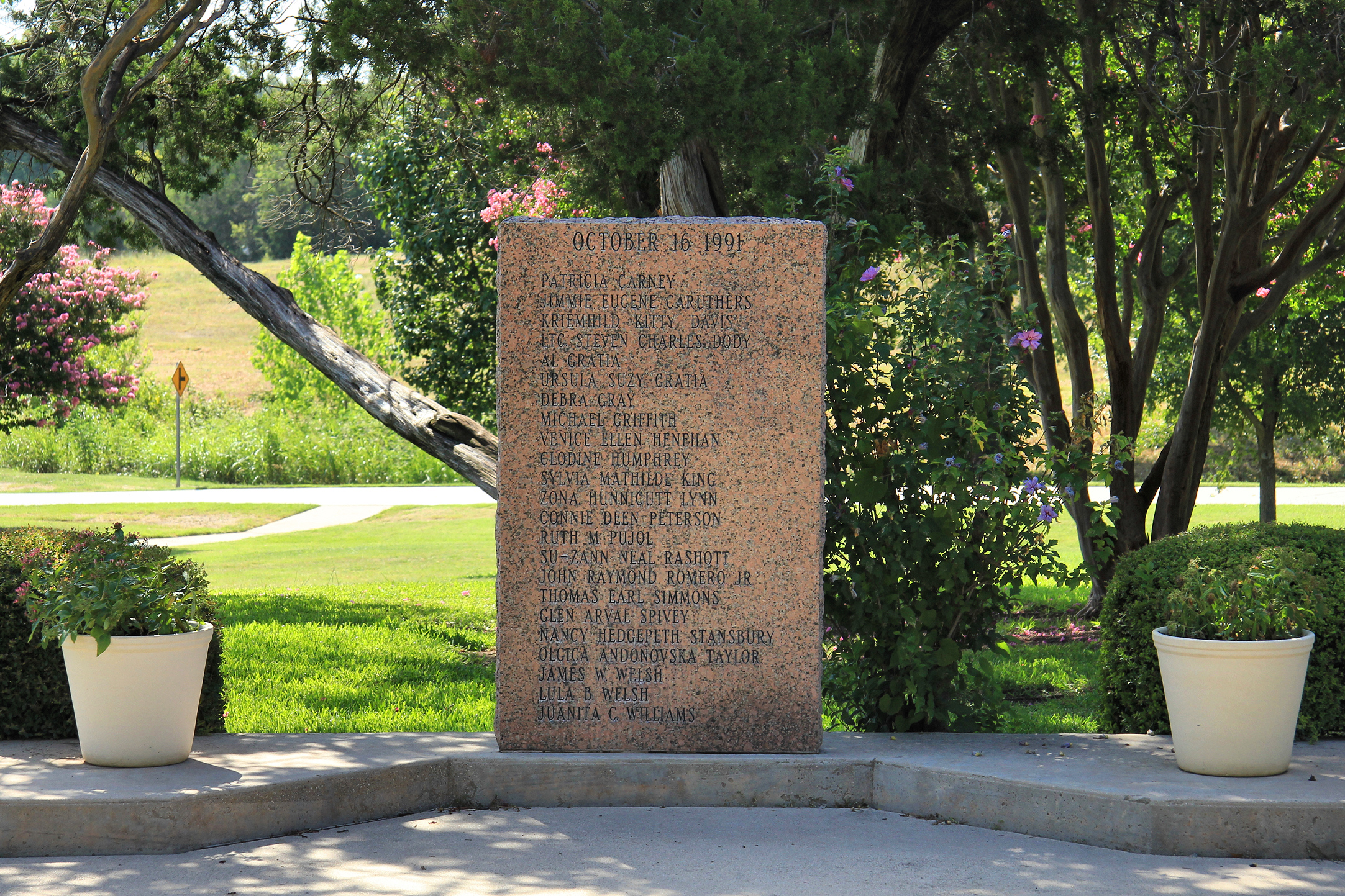
The pink granite memorial listing the 23 dead

An anticrime bill was scheduled for a vote in the U.S. House of Representatives the day after the massacre. Some of the victims had been constituents of Rep. Chet Edwards, and in response, he abandoned his opposition to a gun control provision that was part of the bill. The provision, which did not pass, would have banned some weapons and magazines like one used by Hennard.

Prayer vigils were held. Families of deceased victims, survivors, and policemen received counseling for grief, shock, and stress.

The Texas State Rifle Association and others preferred that the state allow its citizens to carry concealed weapons. Democratic Governor Ann Richards vetoed such bills, but in 1995, her Republican successor, George W. Bush, signed one into force. The law had been campaigned for by Suzanna Hupp, who was present at the massacre; both of her parents, Alphonse "Al" Gratia and Ursula "Suzy" Gratia, were killed by Hennard. She later testified that she would have liked to have had her .38 revolver, but said, "It was a hundred feet away in my car." She left it there fearing that if she was caught carrying it she might lose her chiropractor's license. Hupp testified across the country in support of concealed handgun laws, and was elected to the Texas House of Representatives in 1996.

A pink granite memorial stands behind the Killeen Community Center with the date of the event and the names of those killed.

=== Present site ===
The cafeteria reopened five months after the massacre, but closed permanently on September 8, 2000. In 2006, a buffet called "Yank Sing" occupied the former cafeteria. It remains open as of November 2026.

== See also ==
- Gun violence in the United States
- Mass shootings in the United States
- 2009 Fort Hood shooting and 2014 Fort Hood shootings, two other mass shootings in Killeen, Texas
- San Ysidro McDonald's massacre, the deadliest mass shooting in the United States prior to the Luby's shooting
- List of shootings in Texas
