= Brad Buckley (politician) =

Texan veterinarian and politician

Member of the Texas House of Representatives from the 54th district
- Incumbent
- Assumed office January 8, 2019
- Preceded by: Scott Cosper

Personal details
- Born: Bradley Leo Buckley; September 14, 1966 (age 60)
- Party: Republican
- Spouse: Dr. Susan Buckley
- Children: 3
- Education: Texas A&M University (BA, DVM)
- Website: Campaign website

Bradley Leo Buckley (born September 14, 1966) is a Texas veterinarian and Republican member of the Texas House of Representatives for House District 54, which includes part of Bell County and all of Lampasas County in Central Texas.

== Education ==
Buckley earned his Bachelor of Arts degree in 1989 and his Doctor of Veterinary Medicine in 1993 from Texas A&M University.

== Career ==
Since 1994, he has been a veterinarian having his own practice in Killeen, Texas.

=== Texas House of Representatives ===
On May 22, 2018, Buckey defeated incumbent Scott Cosper in the Republican primary runoff election for the Texas House District 54. On November 6, 2018, Buckley won the general election with 53.8% of the vote; Kathy Richerson, his Democratic opponent, received 46.2%.

In 2021, Buckley introduced legislation that would prohibit companies that produce meat-like substances made from plants from using the terms "meat" in their labelling. Livestock companies and their lobbying organizations supported the bill, while plant-based food companies like Beyond Meat and Impossible Burgers described the bill as a violation of free speech.

In 2023, Buckley authored legislation to provide financial support to school districts to purchase high-quality instructional materials.

Texas House of Representatives
Preceded by Scott Cosper	Texas State Representative from District 54; 2019–present	Succeeded by Incumbent
