= Scott Cosper =

Texas politician

Rodney Scott Cosper

Member of the Texas House of Representatives from the 54th district
- In office January 10, 2017 – January 8, 2019
- Preceded by: Jimmie Don Aycock
- Succeeded by: Brad Buckley

Personal details
- Born: 1968 (age 57–58)
- Party: Republican
- Spouse: Christina R. "Christy" Cosper
- Children: Two daughters
- Website: http://scottcosper.com

Rodney Scott Cosper, known as Scott Cosper (born 1968), is an American politician who served one term as a Republican member of the Texas House of Representatives for the 54th District. Cosper succeeded Republican Jimmie Don Aycock, who did not seek re-election in 2016. Cosper is also a former mayor of Killeen, Texas.

In his bid for a second term in 2018, Cosper was forced into a runoff election on May 22 with fellow Republican Bradley Leo "Brad" Buckley (born 1966), a veterinarian who formerly served on the board of the Killeen School District.

Cosper had led the three-candidate GOP field in 2016 with 4,472 (44.6 percent) to Buckley's 4,173 (41.6 percent). The remaining 1,390 votes (13.9 percent) went to Larry R. Smith, whose supporters were critical in the second round of balloting. Smith had also finished third in the 2016 primary. Cosper was then unseated in the runoff, 3,185 votes (41.7 percent) to Buckley's 4,445 (58.3 percent).
