= Jimmie Don Aycock =

American politician

Member of the Texas House of Representatives from the 54th district
- In office 2007–2017
- Succeeded by: Scott Cosper

Personal details
- Born: November 4, 1946 (age 79)
- Party: Republican
- Education: Texas A&M University (BS, DVM)

Jimmie Don Aycock (born November 4, 1946) is an American politician who served as a member of the Texas House of Representatives for the 54th district from 2007 to 2017.

== Background ==
Don Aycock earned a Bachelor of Science degree and Doctor of Veterinary Medicine from Texas A&M University. After serving as a captain in the United States Army, he returned to Texas, where he worked as a veterinarian, rancher, and businessman.

== Legacy ==
A middle school in Killeen, Texas was named after Aycock, and opened on August 14, 2024. Aycock attended the school's dedication ceremony on July 18 and received a letter jacket with his name and the school's logo.
