= 2014 Fort Hood shootings =

Mass shooting in Texas, U.S.

- Location of the main cantonment of Fort Hood in Bell County
- Location: 31°8′33″N 97°47′47″W; Fort Hood, Texas, U.S.
- Date: April 2, 2014; 12 years ago c. 4:00 – c. 4:08 p.m. (CDT; UTC−05:00)
- Attack type: Spree shooting, mass shooting, murder-suicide, workplace shooting, drive-by shooting
- Weapon: .45-caliber Smith & Wesson M&P semi-automatic pistol
- Deaths: 4 (including the perpetrator)
- Injuries: 14 (12 by gunfire)
- Perpetrator: Ivan A. Lopez-Lopez

On April 2, 2014, a spree shooting occurred at several locations on the Fort Hood military base near Killeen, Texas. Four people, including the gunman, were killed while 14 additional people were injured; 12 by gunshot wounds. The shooter, 34-year-old Army Specialist Ivan Lopez-Lopez, died of a self-inflicted gunshot wound.

== Shootings ==
Immediately prior to the shooting, Lopez went to the 49th Transportation Battalion administrative office where he tried to obtain a ten-day leave form so he could attend to "family matters". However, he was informed that he would have to come back later to retrieve it, sparking a verbal altercation between him and several other soldiers. The request was ultimately denied because Lopez had already secured housing in an apartment in Killeen.

Lopez then went outside to smoke a cigarette. At approximately 4:00 p.m., he returned and opened fire with a .45-caliber Smith & Wesson M&P pistol inside the same building, injuring three soldiers— PFC Wilfred Sanchez, Sgt. Jonathan Westbrook, and SFC Warren Hardnett— all of whom had been involved in the altercation with Lopez. Lopez also killed Sgt. First Class Daniel Ferguson, who was attempting to barricade a lockless conference room door to prevent Lopez from gaining entry and harming anyone inside.

Lopez then got into his car and drove slowly to a motor pool building to which he had been assigned, firing at two soldiers and wounding one of them along the way on 73rd Street. Upon reaching the building, Lopez fired at a soldier inside the office, but missed her and grazed the head of another soldier. He then killed Sgt. Timothy Owens when Sgt. Owens approached him and tried to talk him down, and wounded another soldier. He then moved on to the building's vehicle bay area, where he injured two soldiers, after which his weapon misfired. Lopez then proceeded to the 1st Medical Brigade headquarters in his car.

Along the way, he fired a round into a car occupied by two soldiers, wounding the passenger. Reaching the intersection of 73rd Street and Motorpool Road, Lopez shot at two other soldiers, but missed both of them. Reaching the medical building, Lopez shot and wounded 1st Lt. John Arroyo Jr., in the throat as he was walking outside in the western parking lot. He then entered the building and fatally shot a soldier at the main entrance desk, Staff Sgt. Carlos Lazaney-Rodriguez; he also wounded two other soldiers inside. Then, Lopez walked down the main hallway, wounded MAJ Patrick W. Miller, shooting him point blank in the abdomen, and exited through a doorway.

Approximately eight minutes after the shooting first started, Lopez drove to the parking lot of another building, Building 39002, where he was confronted by an unidentified military police officer, with whom he had a verbal exchange. When he brandished his weapon, the officer fired a shot at him that missed. Lopez responded by committing suicide, shooting himself in the right side of the head. Two medics from 1st Medical Brigade, with whom the officer was originally speaking, began administering medical aid along with the officer on Lopez before they assisted in providing aid to the wounded. A total of 34 rounds were fired during the shooting spree: eleven at the administrative office, nine at the motor pool building, five at the medical building, and nine from inside his car. It was later revealed that Lopez, who was in uniform at the time of the shooting, wasn't authorized to carry a concealed firearm.

=== Victims ===
Three people were killed in the shooting, excluding the gunman. They were identified as:

| Name | Age | Hometown | Rank/occupation | Notes |
|---|---|---|---|---|
| Daniel Michael Ferguson | 39 | Mulberry, Florida, U.S. | Sergeant first class | Died while barricading a door |
| Timothy Wayne Owens | 37 | Effingham, Illinois, U.S. | Sergeant | Died while trying to talk down Lopez |
| Carlos Alberto Lazaney-Rodriguez | 38 | Aguadilla, Puerto Rico | Staff sergeant | Died at his post |

== Aftermath ==
During the shooting, the Bell County Communications Center dispatched deputies and troopers from the Texas Department of Public Safety to the nearby post after receiving reports of an "active shooter", sheriff's Lt. Donnie Adams said. Federal Bureau of Investigation spokeswoman Michelle Lee said its agents were also headed to the scene. The base confirmed the shooting in a brief statement posted online on April 2, 2014. On its Twitter feed and Facebook page, Fort Hood officials ordered everyone on base to "shelter in place" during the shooting.

All of the injured victims were taken to Carl R. Darnall Army Medical Center, for initial treatment and stabilization. Once they were stabilized they were then transferred to Scott & White Memorial Hospital where they received further care. As of April 10, twelve of the sixteen wounded had been released from the hospitals and returned to duty, while the other four remained hospitalized in stable condition.

Reacting to the incident, President Barack Obama said at a fundraiser in Chicago that he was left "heartbroken" and assured that the events would be investigated. The base was previously the scene of a mass shooting in 2009, in which 13 people were killed and more than 30 wounded. One week after the shooting, Obama and First Lady Michelle Obama traveled to Fort Hood to attend a ceremony honoring the victims.

On April 16, discussion was renewed over if soldiers should be allowed to carry concealed firearms on military bases in Texas and other states.

On January 23, 2015, the Army concluded from an investigation into the shooting that there was no indication of a possibility of violent behavior from Lopez through his medical and personnel records. A report on the investigation cited that Lopez's commanders knew very little of his personal difficulties and would have provided him with help had he disclosed these difficulties. It also highlighted gaps in information sharing, as Lopez's supervisors believed they were unable to obtain his personal information due to federal medical privacy laws. Previously, in the wake of the aforementioned 2009 Fort Hood shooting, information sharing regarding medical history was among 78 recommendations suggested to identify the risk of violent behavior. However, this recommendation was not implemented due to "constraints on exchanging information between military and civilian behavioral health care providers". The 2015 report recommended improvements with the level of contact between commanders and their newly assigned soldiers, and that soldiers should register personally owned weapons with their commanders.

== Perpetrator ==
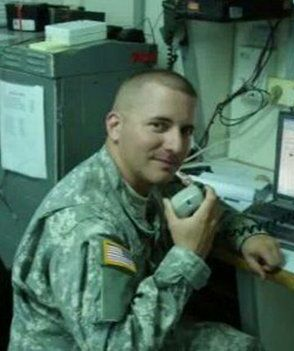
Ivan A. Lopez-Lopez

Ivan A. Lopez-Lopez (October 23, 1979 – April 2, 2014) was an Iraq War veteran who was born in Ponce, Puerto Rico. He enlisted in the Puerto Rico National Guard on January 4, 1999, but was unable to pass a required English language course and was subsequently discharged on November 30 of the same year. Lopez reenlisted on April 30, 2003, as an infantryman and served until 2010. He served on active duty in the United States Army in June 2008. He was married and had four children, two of them from a previous marriage.

=== Service in the U.S. Army ===
Lopez was a specialist, and at the time of the shooting, he was assigned to the 13th Sustainment Command, a logistics and support unit at Fort Hood. He was previously assigned in Fort Bliss, but was transferred to another base for four months, then moved to Fort Hood two months prior to the shooting. Lopez previously reported at Fort Hood in 2006 during his time in the Puerto Rico National Guard, where he was given orders to deploy to Egypt from February 15, 2007, to February 10, 2008.

From August 6 to December 18, 2011, Lopez served a tour in Iraq, participating in Operation New Dawn as security detail. On or about December 12, his convoy was involved in a roadside bombing. Though Lopez would allege that he had experiences in direct combat in Iraq and cited the bombing of his convoy, investigators determined he was not within the blast radius of the bomb used.

On November 29, 2013, he began receiving MOS reclassification training at Fort Leonard Wood, Missouri, graduating three months later. During his time there, he attempted to purchase a weapon on two occasions. On the second occasion, Lopez was persuaded by a classmate to reconsider the purchase.

=== Motives for the shooting ===
Lopez was allegedly distraught over financial issues and the deaths of his grandfather and then his mother during a two-month period five months prior to the shooting. He was also undergoing regular psychiatric treatment for depression, anxiety, and posttraumatic stress disorder. He tried to take leave in order to attend his mother's funeral in Puerto Rico. It took five days for the leave to be approved, but he was only allowed to be absent for 24 hours, which allegedly upset him. The leave was eventually extended to two days. More recently, Lopez had asked for a transfer, claiming that he was "being taunted and picked on" by other soldiers in his unit.

During a press conference on the day of the shooting, Fort Hood Commander Mark A. Milley stated that Lopez died of a self-inflicted gunshot wound. On March 1, 2014, over one month prior to the shooting, Lopez purchased the weapon used in the shooting from Guns Galore, the same store where Nidal Malik Hasan, the convicted perpetrator of the Fort Hood shooting in 2009, originally purchased his own weapon. Lopez's weapon was not registered with the installation. He had previously purchased a firearm of the same model, unregistered with the installation, on February 23, although he reported it stolen on March 1, the same day he bought a replacement. During that same month, he had seen a psychiatrist and was prescribed Ambien for a sleeping problem.

In his Facebook account, Lopez made posts in which he alleged that he was robbed by two men in early March and also criticized Adam Lanza, the perpetrator of the Sandy Hook Elementary School shooting in 2012. Lopez also described his experiences in direct combat during his tour in Iraq, although military officials confirmed that Lopez did not experience any direct combat. A Facebook page created by Lopez claimed that he was a sniper who had been to the Central African Republic.

On March 24, Lopez's battalion began tracking a ten-day permissive temporary duty (PTDY) request he made immediately after arriving to Fort Hood so he could help his family relocate to an apartment in Killeen, as his current one was burglarized. He was given a four-day pass by his acting sergeant, who informed him that he would receive PTDY after his return. Lopez took the pass from March 27 to March 30. He returned to Fort Hood on March 31, though when he received the PTDY form, it was filled with errors and Lopez had to resubmit it with corrections. Though the corrected form was signed, it did not have a control number, which is reported to have led to the conflict in the 49th Transportation Battalion office that sparked the shooting.

== See also ==
- 2009 Fort Hood shooting, another mass shooting that occurred on the base
- 2015 Chattanooga shootings, a spree shooting committed in 2015 at two military installations in Chattanooga, Tennessee
- Luby's shooting, another mass shooting in Killeen, Texas
- Washington Navy Yard shooting, a mass shooting committed in 2013 at the United States Naval Sea Systems Command
- List of shootings in Texas
