= Abraham Thomas (mass murderer) =

American mass murderer (1928–1958)

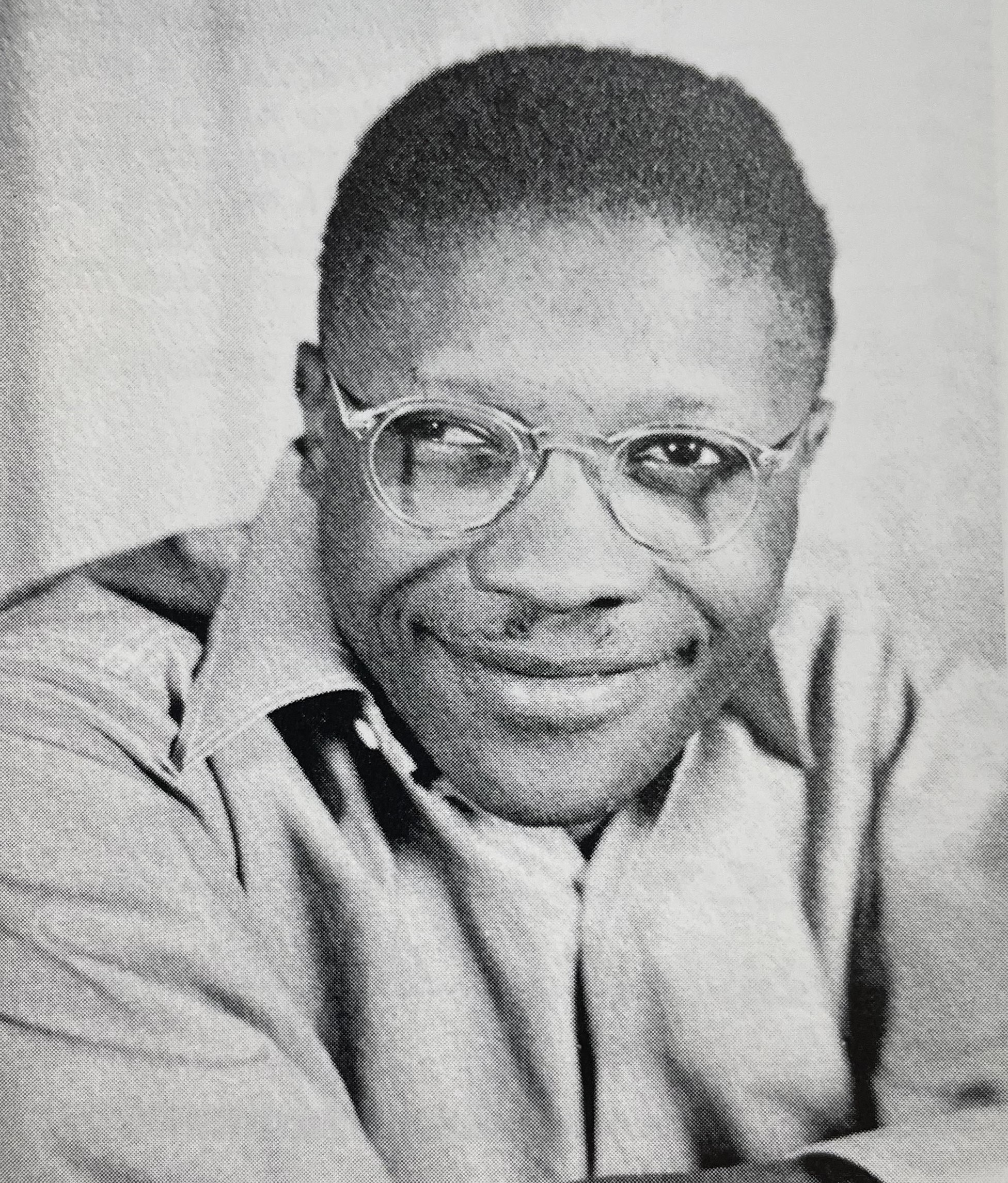
- Born: 1928; Montezuma, Georgia, U.S.
- Died: July 23, 1958 (aged 29); United States Disciplinary Barracks, Kansas, U.S.
- Status: Executed by hanging
- Motive: Jealousy
- Conviction: Premeditated murder (4 counts)
- Penalty: Death

Details
- Date: February 23, 1954
- Country: West Germany
- Location: Gersthofen
- Killed: 4
- Weapon: M1 carbine
- Military career
- Allegiance: United States
- Branch: United States Army
- Rank: Private First Class

Abraham Thomas (1928 – July 23, 1958) was a United States Army soldier and a mass murderer who shot and killed two fellow soldiers and their girlfriends in the town of Gersthofen in West Germany on February 23, 1954. He was tried by a military court-martial, sentenced to death, and hanged in 1958. Thomas was a member of the 109th Infantry Regiment.

== Events preceding the murders ==
Thomas, who was awaiting a discharge since he was of low intellect, was infatuated with a German woman named Walburga Wenderoth. However, she was not his girlfriend and was instead with Corporal Edward Peters. Eventually, Thomas and Wenderoth stopped being friends, and on February 5, 1954, the two got into a fight at her house, which resulted in the police being called. Thomas was searched and found with a knife in his possession. He was taken into military police custody. After Thomas was advised of his rights, he told one of the officers that he was jealous of Wenderoth "running around with other men." The incident ended with only a simple delinquency report against Thomas.

On February 8, 1954, Thomas went on field maneuvers with his company. He was issued the M1 carbine regularly assigned to him. However, when Thomas's company returned to their barracks on February 20, he did not turn in his rifle as required. He went to Regensburg, and returned two days later, and went directly to Wenderoth's home. She and another woman, Anna Wiegel, were there. Thomas conversed with Wenderoth and according to pre-trial statements, "everything seemed to be okay." About 20 minutes later, however, the situation took a turn for the worse.

Peters and another soldier, Sergeant Lafayette Bennett entered the house. Peters insulted Thomas, which led to a fight breaking out between the two. Bennett joined in, and he and Peters forced Thomas out of the house. Thomas immediately went back inside, intending to beat up Peters. However, the four inside kicked him out a second time, pushing and kicking him outside the yard gate. Bennett told Thomas to leave and insulted him. Thomas replied that he would, "but I'll God damn sure will be back shortly." Thomas then returned to his barracks. He woke up the armor artificer and asked for the key to the supply room, saying he needed his parka since he had left the key to his wall locker in it. The man gave the key to Thomas, but he returned it a few minutes later. Thomas then went to his roommate, Sergeant Glendown, who was the supply sergeant, and asked him for the duplicate key to his wall locker. Glendown gave him his key ring.

== Murders and Thomas's version of events ==
According to Thomas, he then went to the ammunition room and took a clip of ammunition before returning to his room. He tried to read but couldn't since he had "blood in . . . [his] eyes." Putting aside the book, Thomas ate some C-rations, but the food "wouldn't stay on . . . [his] stomach." Thomas tried to go to bed, but was unable to sleep. Sergeant Glendown talked to him, but Thomas did not hear what he said. All he could think about had happened at Wenderoth's house. About two hours later, Thomas got up, got partially dressed, took his carbine and the ammunition, and went to Wenderoth's house, walking nearly two miles.

Upon arriving, Thomas found Wenderoth's door unlocked. He went inside and saw her and Peters together in the bedroom. This is when the murders started. According to Thomas, he had wanted to talk to Wenderoth, but she swore at him. Thomas "had it right then" and shot her. When he turned to leave, he saw a "shadow" out of the "corner of his eye" and thought Peters was reaching for a weapon, so he shot him as well.

As Thomas went to the kitchen, he was suddenly jumped by Bennett, then Wiegel. Bennett lunged at Thomas and tried to grab his rifle. According to Thomas, Bennett killed himself, saying, he did not intend to harm Bennett, but his finger was on the trigger and the gun went off. Thomas said Wiegel then "fastened me around the waist." He pushed her off, but after she refused to let go, he shot her as well.

Thomas then used an axe to bludgeon, hack, and mutilate the bodies. Afterwards, he returned to his barracks and turned in his carbine. The bodies were found several hours later. Thomas was arrested the same day. Under an agreement with West Germany, the U.S. military had jurisdiction over the case since Thomas was an American soldier. On February 28, he was charged with four counts of premeditated murder. His court-martial started in April 1954. Thomas was tried by a military court in Augsburg, West Germany.

== Court-martial and execution ==
At Thomas's court-martial, defense counsel First Lieutenant William A. Bonwell argued for convictions on lesser charges of unpremeditated murder and manslaughter, which would spare his client from possible execution and instead result in a lengthy prison sentence.

In regard to Wenderoth's death, Bonwell claimed it was the "impulsive culmination of 'accumulated' passion." For her death, the court was provided with instructions for the lesser-included offense of voluntary manslaughter. As for Peters, he said that Thomas had acted "spontaneously" and was therefore guilty of a lesser charge. As for Bennett and Wiegel, Bonwell argued that each death resulted from sudden an impulsive acts from Thomas, and he was not guilty of premeditated murder. For the deaths of Bennett and Wiegel, the court was provided with instructions for involuntary manslaughter and unpremeditated murder, respectively.

The court-martial lasted five days. Ultimately, Thomas was convicted of four counts of premeditated murder, with the court ruling that each of the four killings were calculated and deliberate. In one of Thomas's pretrial statements, he said he stood just inside the bedroom door, about ten feet away from Wenderoth, when he shot her, and that there was no light in the bedroom. However, the light in the kitchen shined into the bedroom and would've enabled him to see. The prosecution used medical testimony to prove that Thomas shot Wenderoth at close range. As for Peters, the court said he had been shot several times when he was on "his all fours in the bed."

The prosecution said Bennett was discovered lying stretched out on a couch being used as a makeshift bed. His head was on the pillow, a sheet was covered him, and his hands were at his lower chest. The couch was against the kitchen wall and a few feet from the doorway between the kitchen and the bedroom. The head of the couch was against the doorway wall. A bullet was dug out of the wall, at the head end of the couch. According to an army doctor, Bennett would've "lost consciousness immediately" from his wound and could not have "performed any activity whatsoever." As for Anna, the court ruled there was an "appreciable interval of time" between when Anna "fastened herself" around Thomas and when she was fatally shot.

On April 15, 1954, Thomas was sentenced to death. In June 1954, he was transferred to the United States Disciplinary Barracks in Fort Leavenworth to await his execution. After Thomas's appeals failed and he was denied clemency by President Dwight Eisenhower, an execution date was set for July 23, 1958. Before his execution, he found comfort in religion, which helped him accept his fate. On the morning of his execution, however, Thomas was extremely hostile towards everyone at the prison. He yelled that Eisenhower didn't care about him, didn't know what he was going through, and didn't care about the common people.

On the night of his execution, Commandant Colonel James W. Davis arrived at Thomas's cell, and he was led out to the gallows. He wore his U.S. Army uniform stripped of its insignia. After Thomas mounted the scaffold, Davis read the court order that his death sentence be carried out and concluded, "May the Lord have mercy on your soul." In his final statement, Thomas thanked Davis for the treatment that he'd received on death row. He was hanged at 12:04 AM, and pronounced dead by an Army physician 17 minutes later. His remains were then placed in a coffin and shipped back to his hometown in Georgia for burial.

== See also ==
- Capital punishment by the United States military
- List of people executed by the United States military
- List of people executed in the United States in 1958
