= List of people executed in the United States in 1958 =

Fifty people, all male, were executed in the United States in 1958, thirty-five by electrocution, thirteen by gas chamber, and two by hanging.

== List of people executed in the United States in 1958 ==
No.	Date of execution	Name	Age of person			Gender	Ethnicity	State	Method	Ref.
No.	Date of execution	Name	At execution	At offense	Age difference	Gender	Ethnicity	State	Method	Ref.
1	January 3, 1958	Norman E. Walker	34	33	1	Male	White	Ohio	Electrocution	
2	January 9, 1958	Elmer Francis Burke	40	35	5	Male	White	New York	Electrocution	
3	January 10, 1958	Robert Victor Mohrhaus	23	22	1	Male	White	Ohio	Electrocution	
4	January 17, 1958	Edward Samuel Smith	23	Unknown	Unknown	Male	Black	Georgia	Electrocution	
5	January 17, 1958	William Alvin Wetzel	32	27	5	Male	White	Mississippi	Gas chamber	
6	February 6, 1958	Charles White	44	41	3	Male	White	Texas	Electrocution	
7	February 14, 1958	James Reese	26	23	3	Male	Black	California	Gas chamber	
8	February 28, 1958	Julius Bunton	21	20	1	Male	Black	North Carolina	Gas chamber	
9	February 28, 1958	James Vaughan	31	29	2	Male	Black	Ohio	Electrocution	
10	March 6, 1958	John Wayne Mack	25	24	1	Male	Black	Texas	Electrocution	
11	March 28, 1958	Jeremiah Reeves Jr.	22	16	6	Male	Black	Alabama	Electrocution	
12	April 11, 1958	Alfred Thomas Faciane	23	21	2	Male	Black	Louisiana	Electrocution	
13	April 11, 1958	Johnny McMiller	44	42	2	Male	Black	Louisiana	Electrocution	
14	April 15, 1958	Eugene T. Burwell	34	28	6	Male	Black	California	Gas chamber	
15	April 15, 1958	James Alonzo Rogers	29	22	7	Male	White	California	Gas chamber	
16	April 18, 1958	William Golden	23	22	1	Male	Black	Georgia	Electrocution	
17	April 18, 1958	Jeremiah McCray	23	23	0	Male	Black	Virginia	Electrocution	
18	May 26, 1958	Bozzie Nelson	45	44	1	Male	Black	Florida	Electrocution	
19	May 28, 1958	Jimmy C. Cameron	23	21	2	Male	Black	Mississippi	Gas chamber	
20	June 5, 1958	Eugene Henry Linger	30	29	1	Male	White	West Virginia	Electrocution	
21	June 6, 1958	E.J. Sherod	24	23	1	Male	Black	Virginia	Electrocution	
22	June 7, 1958	Barton Kay Kirkham	21	19	2	Male	White	Utah	Hanging	
23	June 11, 1958	Alvin Charles Blankenship	27	26	1	Male	Black	Texas	Electrocution	
24	June 13, 1958	George Lowell Everett	23	19	4	Male	White	Florida	Electrocution	
25	June 20, 1958	Theodore Thompson	23	22	1	Male	Black	Texas	Electrocution	
26	July 1, 1958	Larry Paul Fudge	26	25	1	Male	White	West Virginia	Electrocution	
27	July 3, 1958	Nicholas Dan Jr.	20	19	1	Male	Black	New York	Electrocution	
28	July 7, 1958	Robert Lee Jackson	40	37	3	Male	Black	Ohio	Electrocution	
29	July 7, 1958	Lemuel Sam Trotter	31	28	3	Male	Black	Ohio	Electrocution	
30	July 23, 1958	Abraham Thomas	29	25	4	Male	Black	U.S. military	Hanging	
31	July 25, 1958	Jimmy Nebron Shaver	33	29	4	Male	White	Texas	Electrocution	
32	August 7, 1958	Angelo John LaMarca	33	31	2	Male	White	New York	Electrocution	
33	August 15, 1958	Jasper Brazile	43	38	5	Male	Black	Louisiana	Electrocution	
34	September 19, 1958	Albert Curry	26	26	0	Male	Black	Georgia	Electrocution	
35	September 19, 1958	Marshall Lamkin	53	50	3	Male	Black	Texas	Electrocution	
36	September 26, 1958	John Calvin Tipton	23	20	3	Male	White	California	Gas chamber	
37	September 29, 1958	Harry Frank Long	35	30	5	Male	White	Florida	Electrocution	
38	October 24, 1958	Bart Luis Caritativo	52	48	4	Male	Asian	California	Gas chamber	
39	November 7, 1958	William Francis Rupp Jr.	24	18	6	Male	White	California	Gas chamber	
40	November 7, 1958	Leroy Dobbs	36	Unknown	Unknown	Male	Black	Georgia	Electrocution	
41	November 14, 1958	Otha A. Adams	54	53	1	Male	White	Georgia	Electrocution	
42	November 17, 1958	Arthur Thomas	33	27	6	Male	Black	Arizona	Gas chamber	
43	November 20, 1958	Virgil Richardson	29	27	2	Male	Black	New York	Electrocution	
44	November 21, 1958	Clarence Dabney	25	24	1	Male	Black	Virginia	Electrocution	
45	November 22, 1958	Richard Lewis Jordan	28	23	5	Male	White	Arizona	Gas chamber	
46	December 5, 1958	Matthew Phillip Bass	43	Unknown	Unknown	Male	Black	North Carolina	Gas chamber	
47	December 19, 1958	Henry R. Woods	20	19	1	Male	Black	Georgia	Electrocution	
48	December 19, 1958	Richard Carpenter	28	25	3	Male	White	Illinois	Electrocution	
49	December 19, 1958	Allen Dean Jr.	23	23	0	Male	Black	Mississippi	Gas chamber	
50	December 19, 1958	Bennie Collins	55	54	1	Male	Black	Ohio	Electrocution	

== Demographics ==
Gender
Male	50	100%
Female	0	0%
Ethnicity
Black	31	62%
White	18	36%
Asian	1	2%
State
California	6	12%
Georgia	6	12%
Ohio	6	12%
Texas	6	12%
New York	4	8%
Florida	3	6%
Louisiana	3	6%
Mississippi	3	6%
Virginia	3	6%
Arizona	2	4%
North Carolina	2	4%
West Virginia	2	4%
Alabama	1	2%
Illinois	1	2%
U.S. military	1	2%
Utah	1	2%
Method
Electrocution	35	70%
Gas chamber	13	26%
Hanging	2	4%
Month
January	5	10%
February	4	8%
March	2	4%
April	6	12%
May	2	4%
June	6	12%
July	6	12%
August	2	4%
September	4	8%
October	1	2%
November	7	14%
December	5	10%
Age
20–29	28	56%
30–39	11	22%
40–49	7	14%
50–59	4	8%
Total	50	100%

== Executions in recent years ==
Number of executions
1959	50
1958	50
1957	69
Total	169

Preceded by 1957	List of people executed in the United States in 1958	Succeeded by 1959
