= Dwight J. Loving =

American murderer

Dwight Jeffrey Loving
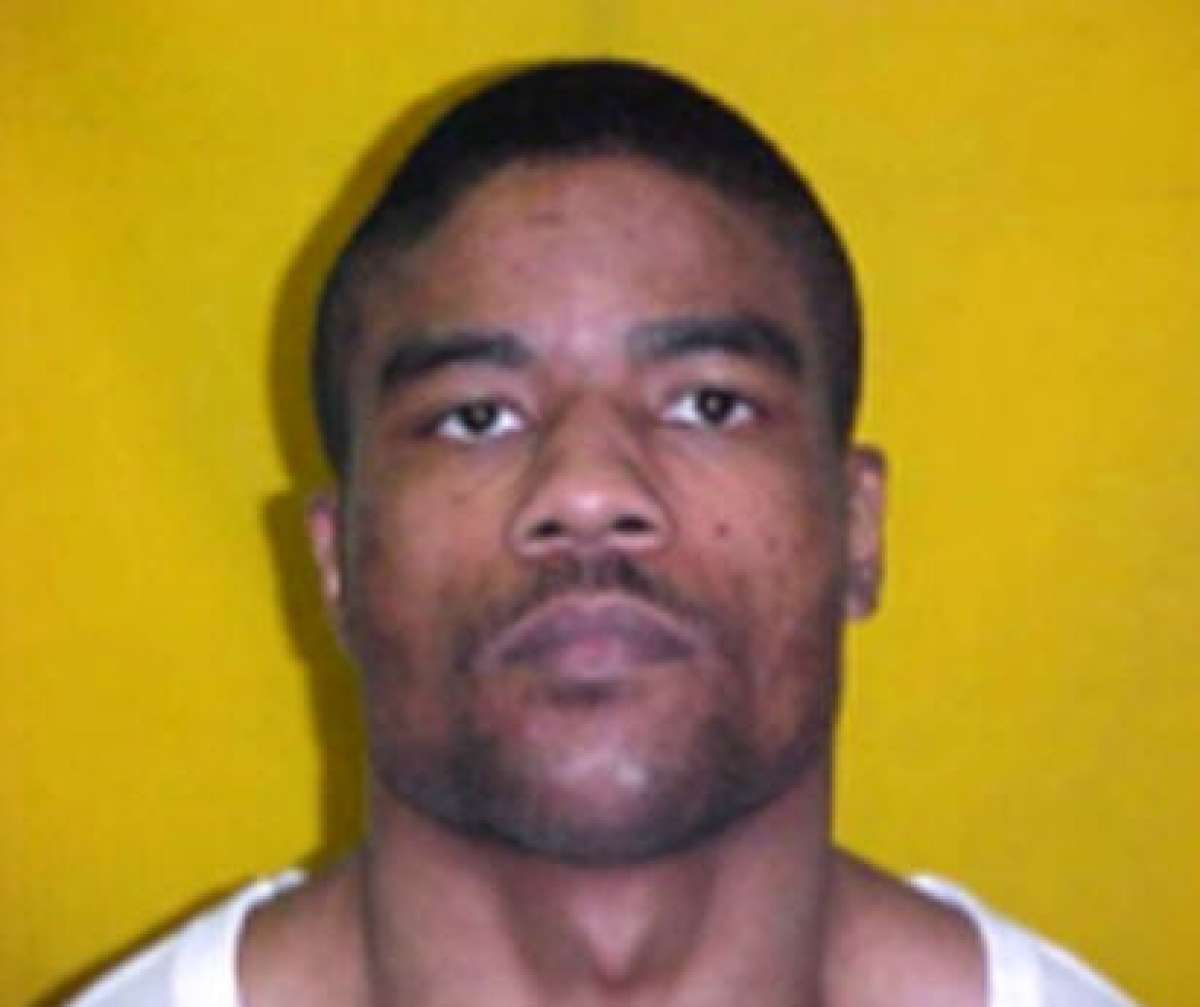
- Loving at Fort Leavenworth in the 2000s
- Born: 1968 (age 57–58); Rochester, New York, U.S.
- Status: Incarcerated
- Motive: Robbery; Eliminating witnesses Thrill
- Convictions: Premeditated murder (2 counts); Attempted murder Robbery (5 counts)
- Penalty: Death; commuted to life imprisonment without parole

Details
- Victims: Christopher Fay, 20; Bobby Sharbino, 44
- Span of crimes: December 11, 1988 – December 12, 1988
- Country: United States
- State: Texas
- Injured: Howard Harrison
- Date apprehended: December 13, 1988
- Imprisoned at: United States Disciplinary Barracks

Dwight Jeffrey Loving (born c. 1968) is a former private in the United States Army who was one of six U.S. military personnel on death row until Barack Obama commuted his sentence to life without parole on January 17, 2017. Loving was sentenced to death following his conviction for murdering two soldiers, working as part-time taxi drivers on December 24, 1988. He was stationed at Fort Hood, Texas at the time of the murders. Loving said he killed his first victim to see if he could get away with it and killed his second one for fun.

== Murders and arrest ==
Dwight Jeffrey Loving was a native of Rochester, New York, born c. 1968. (Note: He was 21 years old when convicted in 1989.) He was an Army Private First Class stationed at Fort Hood, Texas. On the night of December 11, 1988, he committed two armed robberies of convenience stores, netting less than $100. He then decided to rob some cab drivers. On December 24, during the course of those robberies, Loving murdered two taxicab drivers and attempted to murder a third.

The court-martial evidence, which included Loving's undisputed videotaped confession, established that the first robbery and murder victim, Pvt. Christopher Fay, 20, was an active duty soldier working for extra money as a cab driver; at approximately 8:00 p.m. on December 24, Fay drove Loving from Killeen, Texas, to a secluded area of Fort Hood, where Loving robbed him at gunpoint; after taking Fay's money, Loving shot Fay in the back of the head; while watching blood "gushing out" of Fay's head, Loving shot him in the back of the head a second time. Fay's dead body was discovered by another soldier at Fort Hood a short while later.

Loving, after fleeing to his Fort Hood barracks, called for a second cab at 8:15 that same evening. The second cab, driven by retired Army Sergeant Bobby Sharbino, 44, drove Loving from Fort Hood to a secluded street in Killeen. Loving then robbed Sharbino at gunpoint, ordered him to lie down on the seat, and murdered him by shooting him in the head.

After the second murder, Loving socialized with his Italian girlfriend and others at local nightclubs. Later that evening, he robbed and attempted to murder a third cab driver, Howard Harrison, who successfully defended himself. Loving escaped on foot.

The next day, a Joint Task Force composed of FBI, Texas Rangers and the US Army Criminal Investigation Division (USACIDC) agents pursued Loving. Army special agents arrested him and videotaped his confession. He reviewed the tape and signed a transcript of his confession.

== Trial, sentence, appeals, and commutation ==
He was convicted at a court martial held at Ft. Hood in March 1989. He was found guilty on April 3, 1989. He made several attempts to have his sentence invalidated.

The U.S. Supreme Court upheld the constitutionality of his death sentence on June 3, 1996, in a decision by Justice Anthony Kennedy. Loving's attorneys had contended that the doctrine of separation of powers allowed only Congress rather than the President to define the "aggravating factors" that weighed in his sentencing.

He lost a subsequent appeal to the Supreme Court in 2001. The lack of executions in the intervening decades was due to a Supreme Court decision in 1969 had held that the military did not have jurisdiction over crimes committed off-post by military personnel. The Supreme Court's reversal of that decision in 1987 made the possibility of military death sentences more likely. Bill Clinton gave an executive order for death penalty rules, which Loving argued that was a breach of separation-of-powers.

As they had in 1996, attorneys from the Cornell University Law School's Death Penalty Project were seeking further Supreme Court review of his case in November 2009, following his failure to persuade the United States Court of Appeals for the Armed Forces that he had lacked adequate representation during the sentencing phase of his trial.

Loving was not executed because neither George W. Bush nor Barack Obama authorized his execution. According to the New York Times, "Military executions require presidential approval".

On January 17, 2017, three days before leaving office, Obama commuted Loving's death sentence to life imprisonment without parole, "on the condition that Loving shall never have any rights, privileges, claims or benefits arising under the parole and suspension or remission of sentence laws of the United States and the regulations promulgated thereunder governing federal prisoners confined in any penal institution." Obama did not state a reason for his decision, but in Loving's clemency petition, his lawyers had argued, "Issues of command influence, racial discrimination, and improper panel voting procedures – which were ignored by the courts based on technical legal evidentiary rules – will forever overshadow Loving’s death sentence."

== See also ==
- List of people pardoned or granted clemency by the president of the United States
