= Colleen L. McGuire =

United States Army officer

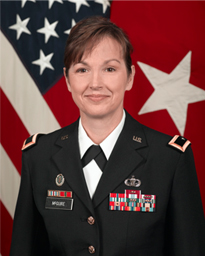
- Military career
- Allegiance: United States
- Branch: United States Army
- Service years: 1979–2011
- Rank: Brigadier General
- Commands: United States Army Criminal Investigation Command; United States Disciplinary Barracks; 705th Military Police Battalion
- Conflicts: Iraq War
- Awards: Army Distinguished Service Medal; Defense Superior Service Medal; Legion of Merit (3); Bronze Star Medal

Brigadier General Colleen L. McGuire is a retired officer of the United States Army. She was the Commanding General of the United States Army Criminal Investigation Command and the 13th Provost Marshal General, the first woman to hold either position. McGuire was also the first woman to be commandant of the United States Disciplinary Barracks, Fort Leavenworth, Kansas.

== Early life and education ==
McGuire grew up in Missoula, Montana, in a military household as the oldest of six children. Her father served 30 years in the United States Army Reserve. McGuire graduated from Sentinel High School in 1975. While in high school, she started in the Army Reserves. She attended the University of Montana (UM), graduating in 1979. McGuire was a radio/television major at UM and a member of the cheerleading squad, the school's Women's Rugby Club, and was a member of the Delta Gamma sorority. Also at the university, she was involved in the Reserve Officers' Training Corps (ROTC). McGuire was a member of the 279th Engineer Company at Fort Missoula through the ROTC Simultaneous Membership Program. At that time her father, William McGuire, was the first sergeant of the company.

== Military career ==
McGuire was commissioned as an officer in the United States Army Military Police Corps in 1979 upon graduation from the University of Montana. She first served in Germany with the 709th Military Police Battalion. In 1989, McGuire worked as a staff officer for the Office of the Chief of Public Affairs in The Pentagon. She was deployed to Somalia in 1993 and 1994. McGuire was promoted to lieutenant colonel in 1996. She became the commander of the 705th Military Police Battalion in Fort Leavenworth in 1998.

When the United States Disciplinary Barracks at Fort Leavenworth were re-opened in 2002, McGuire became the first woman in charge of the prison. She went on to work as the assistant commandant of the United States Army Military Police School. Starting in 2007, McGuire served 18 months as the provost marshal of the multinational corps in Iraq. She was the first woman to serve as a provost marshal in the United States. McGuire was also the senior advisor to the corps commander stationed in Baghdad. In Iraq, she took fire while traveling by convoy and was there when a bullet passed through her barracks. In 2008, she was promoted to the rank of brigadier general. Also in 2008, she led the Army Suicide Prevention Task Force.

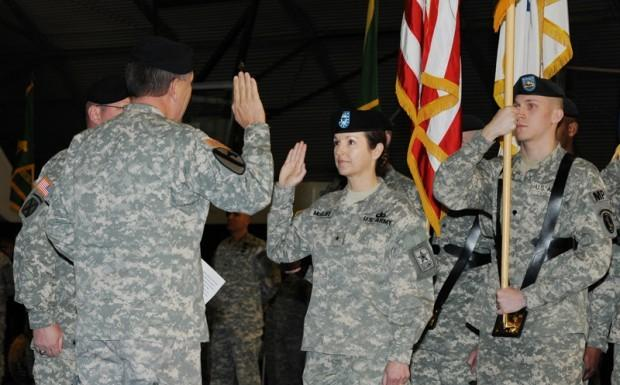
Brigadier General McGuire takes oath of office in Washington D.C. in 2010.

McGuire became the 13th Provost Marshal General of the Army, and first woman to hold the office, on 15 January 2010, commanding the United States Army Criminal Investigation Command (CID).

In 2012, McGuire retired from the army. The next year, she started working for Secretary of Defense, Chuck Hagel to help him study sexual assault in the army. McGuire also worked as the Executive Director of Delta Gamma fraternity in Columbus, Ohio. In 2014, she moved to Kalispell, Montana, to spend more time with family. McGuire also owns a cattle ranch in Eastern Oregon.

== Honors ==
McGuire was awarded the Legion of Merit and a Bronze Star Medal, among other military decorations and awards.

In 2010 McGuire was awarded the University of Montana Distinguished Alumni Award.

In 2019, McGuire was inducted into the US Army Women's Hall of Fame.
