= Murder of Falah Zaggam =

Murder of 17-year-old Iraqi National Guard by U.S. soldier

On 11 May 2004, 17-year-old Falah Zaggam, a private in the Iraqi National Guard, was murdered by 21-year-old Federico Daniel Merida, a U.S. Army National Guardsman, in Ad-Dawr, Saladin Governorate, Iraq. Merida and Zaggam had a sexual encounter while posted on a guard tower outside of town, after which Merida shot Zaggam eleven times before throwing him off the building.

Merida first claimed that Zaggam had either robbed or blackmailed him. Merida later maintained that he had killed Zaggam out of rage while denying accusations of rape levied against him by Zaggam's family and Iraqi military superiors. In September 2004, Merida was convicted of murder by a U.S. military court and sentenced to 25 years imprisonment.

== Background ==
=== Victim ===
Falah Zaggam (Arabic: فَلَّاح ضيغم) was born to a Bedouin farming family. He dropped out of third grade and joined the National Guard in April 2004.

=== Perpetrator ===
Federico Daniel Merida was born in 1983, in Veracruz, Mexico. He suffered sexual abuse as a young child. Merida eventually moved to the United States and became an American citizen. He later got married and had a child in 2002. Merida eventually got a job at a furniture business in Biscoe, North Carolina and joined the North Carolina National Guard, as part of the 113th Field Artillery Battalion's Battery B.

== Murder ==
In early 2004, Merida's national guard unit was deployed to Iraq, where he was assigned to the 30th Brigade Combat Team in Iraq. While at a military base in Ad-Dawr, Merida was put on guard duty and paired with 17-year-old Falah Zaggam, an Iraqi National Guard private.

On the night of 11 May 2004, Merida and Zaggam had a consensual sexual encounter in a lookout tower. However, Merida suddenly flew into a rage afterwards and shot Zaggam 11 times with his M4 carbine. He then threw his body off the tower. After the incident, U.S. and Iraqi soldiers were barred from working in lone pairs at the base.

== Investigation, arrest, and guilty plea ==
Merida initially claimed to have killed Zaggam in self-defense, saying the teen tried to rob him. When skeptical military investigators kept pushing him, Merida then said he shot him in a fit of rage after they had a consensual sexual encounter. He said Zaggam blackmailed him and threatened to expose the encounter to his wife and superior officers. Eventually, however, Merida said Zaggam hadn't done anything to him and that he had just flown into a rage.

Merida was charged with premeditated murder, making false official statements, and dereliction of duty. However, he reached a plea agreement with military prosecutors, in which he pleaded guilty to unpremeditated murder and two counts of making false official statements in front of a military court in Forward Operating Base Danger. The agreement capped Merida's maximum possible sentence to 25 years. He was later acquitted of dereliction of duty.

During Merida's sentencing hearing in September 2005, a psychiatrist testified that the murder was likely triggered by a burst of rage due to the sexual abuse he suffered as a child. He tearfully apologized to Zaggam's family in court. "He was a son, a brother, someone very important to them," Merida said. "I took someone they loved and cared for."

Zaggam's family was heavily critical of the U.S. military's handling of the investigation, which released minimal details about the case. They said they had initially been told that he was in prison for attacking a U.S. soldier. "They lied to me," said Amir Zaggam, one of Falah's brothers. "We didn't know the truth until the next morning when our brother Faris was summoned by Iraqi sergeants and soldiers to retrieve Falah's body."

Zaggam's family said Merida could not have been acting in self-defense. The first bullet had pierced Zaggam's palm, which was burned by the gun blast. This indicated that his hand had been raised against the muzzle. The second bullet entered Zaggam's back and went through his stomach. Zaggam's family and friends also said they did not believe the sexual encounter was consensual, and accused Merida of trying to rape him, then killing him when the teen resisted. However, the defense presented medical evidence that the encounter had been consensual. A psychiatrist for Merida testified that the outburst of violence was triggered by traumatic memories of sexual abuse as a child.

Merida was sentenced to 25 years in prison, the harshest term allowed under his plea agreement. He was also reduced in rank to Private and dishonorably discharged. At the time, Merida's sentence was the harshest handed down to any U.S. personnel convicted of crimes committed during the invasion of Iraq.

Zaggam's family still expressed frustration with the outcome. Faris Zaggam, Falah's older brother, said "I swear to Allah, that even if I went to the States and found that Merida and killed him with my own hands, I still would not be satisfied." The family said the U.S. military had paid them $2,200 in compensation, but that the money didn't even cover the costs for Falah's funeral, $4,500. One of Falah's friends, Iraqi National Guard soldier Matar At-Shammari, expressed doubts over whether Merida would serve most of his sentence.

After being sentenced, Merida was sent to the United States Disciplinary Barracks to serve out his time. He was eventually transferred to a civilian federal prison to serve out the rest of his sentence. Merida was paroled on 31 May 2019.
