= Elmer "Trigger" Burke =

American hitman

Elmer "Trigger" Burke (1917 – January 9, 1958) was an American hitman during the mid-to-late 1940s. He was brought up by his older brother, Charlie. In 1941, he was sent to reform school, but later had his sentence cut for joining the army, where he served in the Italian campaign as an Army Ranger. Later, he served a sentence of two years in Sing Sing Prison for robbery. During his time in jail, his idol and brother, Charlie, was murdered by a man named George Goll. Goll was arrested and later released. To get revenge, Burke shot Goll in Manhattan at the age of 27. Elmer earned his nickname "Trigger" because he would shoot people behind the ear; the police ultimately caught up with him because of his pattern hits. Elmer used to say "He didn't hold up the police station only because they get paid by checks." He would shake down businesses in Manhattan and have them pay him for protection.

Later, he murdered Edward "Poochy" Walsh who was sitting in a bar with his friend "Squeeky" on 12 July 1952. He shot "Poochy" because he attempted to stop Burke from shaking down the bartender for protection money. Walsh was already being paid by the same bartender for protection. Walsh broke up a fight Burke had with the bartender earlier in the day. Burke left the bar, but came back with his .45 and shot Walsh in the face. Burke was approx 5' 7" weight approx 140lbs and never fought with his fists, he always used his .45.

== Brinks Job ==
Burke was a supporting player in The Brinks Job. In 1954, the mobsters who pulled off the record heist hired Burke to murder Joseph 'Specs' O'Keefe, one of the brains behind the million-dollar Brinks robbery, because the Mob believed O'Keefe, who was under pressure from the police, would turn into a stool pigeon.

Burke took the job and traveled to Boston. Hunting O'Keefe, he found him in a Dorchester, Massachusetts housing project and chased him for a half an hour, firing dozens of rounds at his fleeing quarry. He finally shot O'Keefe in the leg after thirty-five minutes. Thinking he had killed O'Keefe, Burke got into his car and drove off. He remained in Boston as a sight-seer.

O'Keefe contacted the police and swore out a complaint against Burke for attempted murder. He was arrested eight days later in Back Bay, Boston and incarcerated at the Charles Street Jail. Burke escaped, but was recaptured a year later while waiting for a bus in Charleston, South Carolina.

== Execution ==
Burke was arrested after a manhunt by Major Case Squad homicide detective (1st Grade) Romolo Imundi and convicted of murdering his friend longshoreman Edward Walsh and was sentenced to death in the electric chair. On 9 January 1958, after eating a final meal of steak, smoking six cigars and spending his last evening reading newspaper clippings about himself, he was executed at Sing Sing Prison. As he was placed into the chair he waved and smiled at the crowd that had gathered to witness his execution.

== See also ==
- List of people executed in New York
- List of people executed in the United States in 1958
