= Forcing a safeguard =

Type of war crime

Forcing a safeguard is a war crime of violating a safeguard, which is an order to protect a property, locations or persons obtained from the enemy or neutral parties, or a guard or guard detachment to enforce this protection. In the United States, forcing a safeguard is punishable by death per Uniform Code of Military Justice (UCMJ).

A safeguard is often placed by a commanding officer in order to prevent looting, pillaging or wanton destruction of enemy property, or to prevent unauthorized requisitioning of goods. The commanding officer can often spare only an individual soldier or a small detachment to enforce the safeguard. Overpowering the guards to loot the goods constitutes forcing a safeguard. Another type of safeguard is a written order left with the enemy or his property, with the intent to protect surrendered enemies from further violence. By placing the safeguard, the officer pledges the honor of his military to protect its target. Thus, violation of the safeguard by personnel from the same military jeopardizes the reputation of the entire country and its military.

== Conditions ==
In order to be convicted of forcing a safeguard, several conditions must be met:

- In the UCMJ, the crime is only applicable if the offender is currently in the military and subject to UCMJ - it does not apply to civilians, neutrals or enemy personnel, or even discharged personnel.
- The safeguard must be placed by a superior officer or commander of the offender's military. The definition does not apply to safeguards left by the enemy or other parties.
- The accused knew or should have known about the existence of the safeguard.
- The accused actually violated the safeguard in a specific manner in a specific time and place, for example by attacking the guard of a property in order to enter the property.

== See also ==
- List of established military terms
