= John A. Bennett =

American convicted of rape and attempted murder (1936–1961)

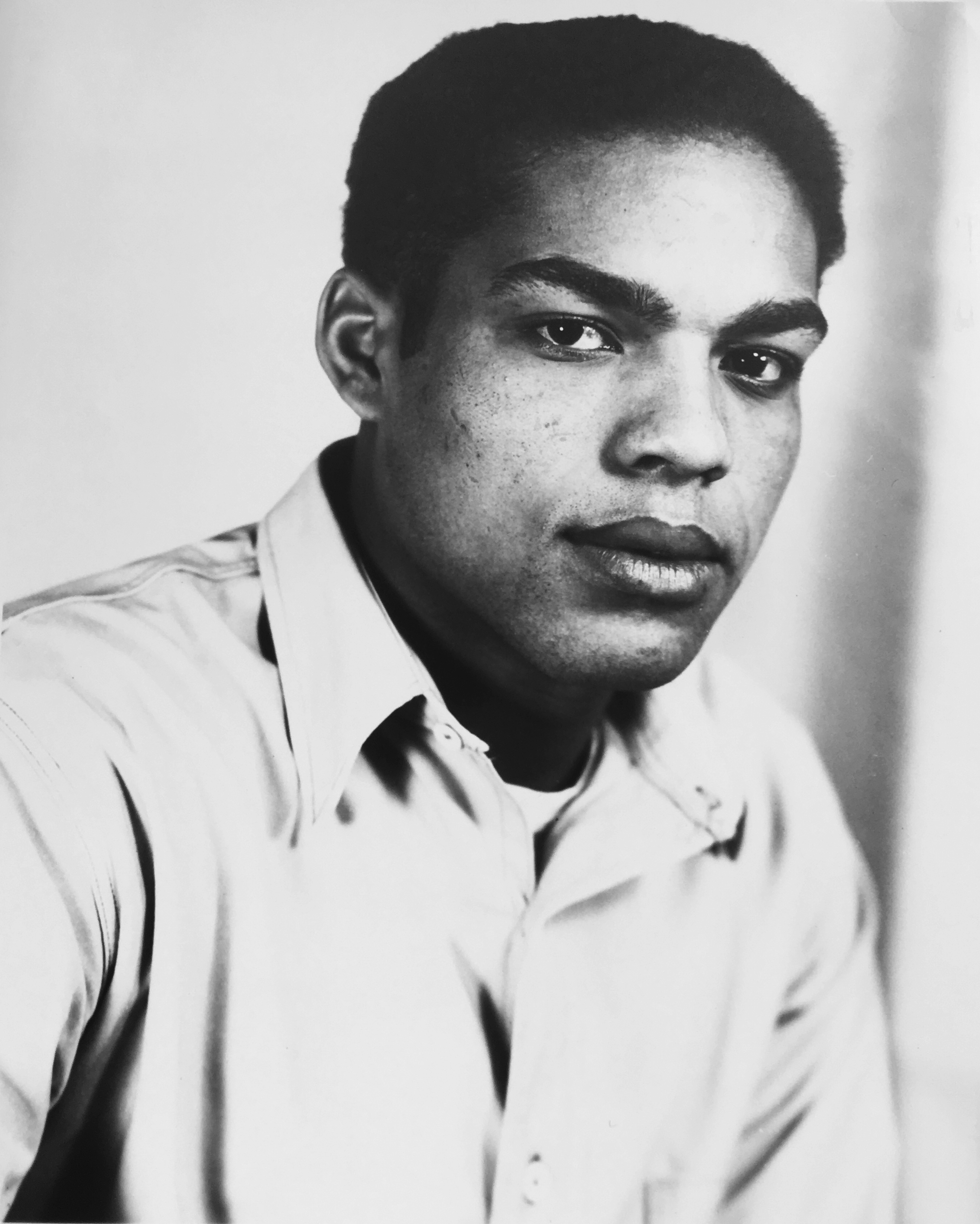
- Bennett shortly after his arrest
- Born: April 10, 1936; Chatham, Virginia, U.S.
- Died: April 13, 1961 (aged 25); United States Disciplinary Barracks, Kansas, U.S.
- Status: Executed by hanging
- Convictions: Attempted premeditated murder Rape
- Penalty: Death
- Military career
- Burial place: Fort Leavenworth Military Prison Cemetery
- Allegiance: United States
- Branch: United States Army
- Service years: 1953–1955
- Rank: Private (E-1)

John Arthur Bennett (April 10, 1936 – April 13, 1961) was a U.S. Army private who was convicted by court-martial of raping and attempting to murder an 11-year-old girl while stationed in Austria. He was sentenced to death for the crimes and was executed by hanging at Fort Leavenworth, Kansas in 1961. Bennett's victim and her parents had requested clemency, but President John F. Kennedy declined to commute the sentence. Bennett is notable primarily because his execution was the last carried out by the United States Armed Forces following a court martial. He remains the only American serviceman to have been executed for rape committed during peacetime.

== Early life ==
Bennett was the fourth of eight children born to a family of sharecroppers in Chatham, Virginia. His schooling finished in the fourth grade. Despite being epileptic, he managed to enlist in the U.S. Army when he was 18. According to a medical review after his arrest, Bennett had an IQ of 67, indicating that he was intellectually disabled.

== Military career ==
Although he dropped out of the Ordnance Corps for academic deficiency, he became an ammunition handler and a truck driver with the U.S. Army's 11th Antiaircraft Artillery Battalion (11th AAA Battalion) at Camp Roeder near Salzburg in Austria.

=== Crime and court-martial ===
In 1954, just days before Christmas, a heavily intoxicated Bennett left Camp Roeder to find a brothel. Witnesses reported seeing him wandering around, entering random civilian homes asking for a girl (or according to some, for a woman) named Margaret or Margot. He even entered one house asking the local occupants if they had chickens. Later that evening, at Siezenheim, he met an 11-year-old girl named Gertrude returning from Christmas shopping for her parents. In a confession he gave to U.S. Army Military Police, he admitted to the rape.

Although Bennett had repeatedly raped Gertrude before strangling her and dumping her in a stream, the child survived. An American officer and his wife testified that she came to their home pleading for help. Gertrude was in a disheveled state, wet and dirty, with blood on her legs. When asked what happened, she responded, "a Negro had choked me". Later, while Gertrude was being cleaned up, she stated that the man had taken off her underwear and stuck something in her. Bennett was arrested by MPs at the base movie theater a few hours later.

Bennett was tried at a general court-martial at the Lehener Kaserne, the former military barracks of the 59th Infantry Regiment of the Imperial-Royal Landwehr in Salzburg, on February 8, 1955. The military court heard medical testimony from a doctor who examined Gertrude at the officer's home, as well as another who saw her later that day at the nearby hospital. Both agreed that she had been raped. A month later, the court-martial found Bennett guilty of rape and attempted premeditated murder. He was sentenced to death by hanging. The death sentence was upheld by President Dwight D. Eisenhower on July 2, 1957.

=== Execution ===
After his sentence was stayed two times by lower courts, the U.S. District Court in Kansas overturned the rulings on appeal in 1960. On February 27, 1961, the newly appointed Secretary of the Army Elvis Jacob Stahr Jr. ordered that the sentence be carried out. Days before Bennett's scheduled execution, Gertrude and her parents wrote to President John F. Kennedy, asking for clemency for Bennett. Her father expressed pity for his parents, while her mother said that while her daughter had been "ruined physically and mentally for her entire life", she would not object to a commutation since Bennett's execution would not change anything. Gertrude, then 17, herself said that she consented to clemency since Bennett's execution would not reverse her trauma; however, she asked that Bennett never be allowed to return to Europe if he was ever released from prison.

Bennett wrote to Kennedy, asking for clemency since the girl did not die. Preoccupied with the planning of the upcoming Bay of Pigs Invasion in Cuba, Kennedy took no action on the appeals and let Eisenhower's death warrant stand. Bennett was hanged at United States Disciplinary Barracks at Fort Leavenworth, Kansas on April 13, 1961, three days after his 25th birthday. His last meal consisted of shrimp with cocktail sauce, hot rolls, cake, peaches, milk, and coffee. Asked if he wanted to make a final statement, Bennett said, "Yes. I wish to take this last opportunity to thank you and each member of the staff for all you have done in my behalf." As he walked to the gallows, he said "pray for me". Bennett currently remains the last person to be executed following a United States Armed Forces court-martial, although this may change pending the outcome of the scheduled execution of Nidal Hasan, the perpetrator of the 2009 Fort Hood shooting.

== See also ==
- Capital punishment by the United States military
- Capital punishment in the United States
- Ronald Gray, until 2026 the only U.S. soldier directed by the President to face execution since Bennett (though that 2008 decision by President George W. Bush was stayed in federal court)
- Nidal Hasan, a former U.S. army major who is awaiting execution per a 2026 decision by President Donald Trump
- List of most recent executions by jurisdiction
- List of people executed by the United States military
- List of people executed in the United States in 1961
