= Ronald Gray =

American soldier and serial killer on death row (born 1965)

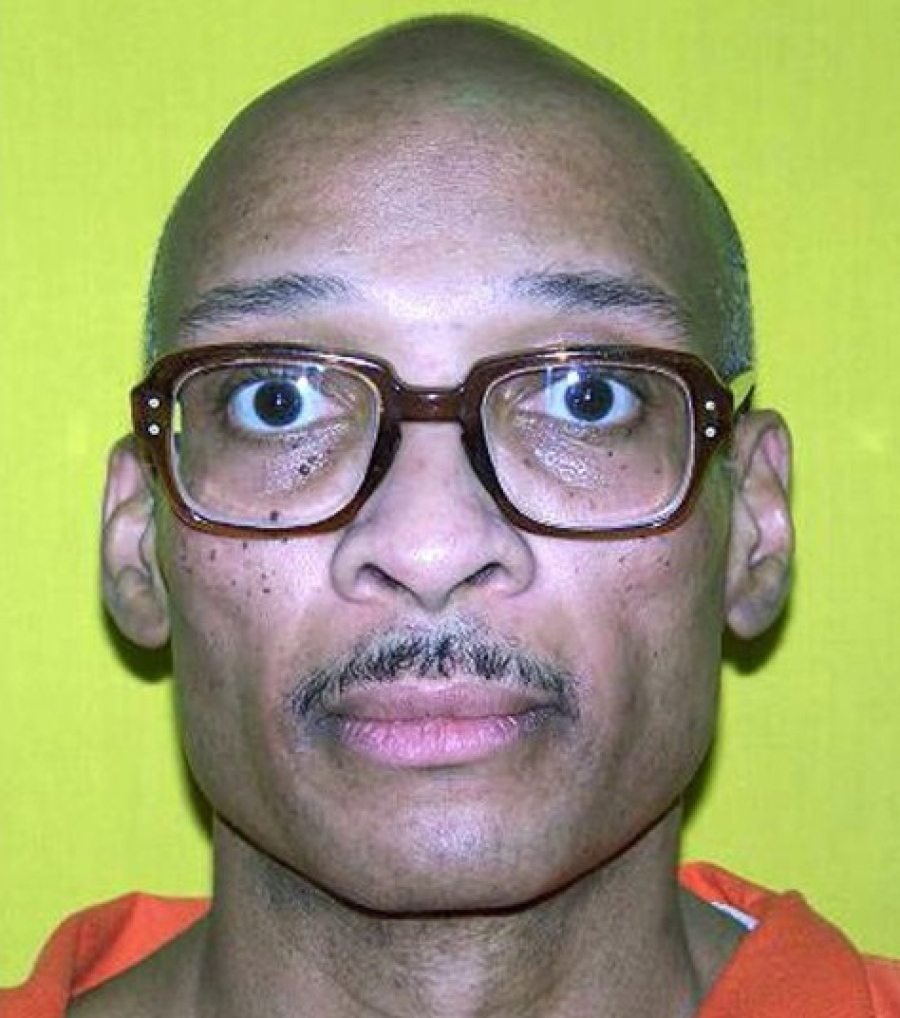
- Gray at Fort Leavenworth, c. March 2008
- Born: August 14, 1965 (age 61); Cochran, Georgia, U.S.
- Status: Incarcerated
- Motive: Sexual sadism
- Convictions: Military; Premeditated murder (2 counts); Attempted premeditated murder Rape (3 counts); Forcible sodomy (2 counts); Robbery (2 counts); Burglary; Larceny; North Carolina; Second degree murder (2 counts); First degree rape (5 counts); First degree sexual offense (5 counts); Attempted first degree rape Second degree kidnapping (3 counts); Robbery with a dangerous weapon (2 counts); First degree burglary (2 counts); Assault with a deadly weapon with intent to kill Assault with a deadly weapon with intent to inflict serious bodily injury
- Penalty: Military; Death; North Carolina; 3 consecutive life sentences

Details
- Span of crimes: April 27, 1986 – January 6, 1987
- Country: United States
- Locations: Fort Bragg, North Carolina
- Targets: Female U.S. Army soldiers and civilians
- Killed: 4
- Injured: 1
- Weapons: .22 caliber pistol, knife
- Imprisoned at: U.S. Disciplinary Barracks
- Military career
- Allegiance: United States
- Branch: United States Army
- Service years: 1984–88 (Dishonorable discharge)
- Rank: Private; Specialist (pre-conviction)
- Unit: XVIII Airborne Corps

Ronald Adrin Gray (born August 14, 1965) is an American serial killer and rapist whose convictions include four counts of murder, one count of attempted murder and eight counts of rape. His crimes were committed when he was in the United States Army, stationed at Fort Bragg, North Carolina.

Gray was first tried by a civilian court, where he pleaded guilty and received eight life terms. However, he was then tried and convicted by a military court and sentenced to death. George W. Bush authorized Gray's execution in 2008, following a Department of Justice review. Gray's execution would have been the first by the U.S. military since 1961. However, on November 26, 2008, a federal judge issued a stay of execution stopping his planned December 10 execution. On January 26, 2012, the Army Court of Criminal Appeals denied relief in Gray's case and on November 13, 2017, the Court of Appeals for the Armed Forces similarly denied an appeal for extraordinary relief.

== Early life ==
Gray was born in Cochran, Georgia, but grew up in Liberty City, a public housing project in Miami. He enlisted at age 18 in 1984 and was assigned to the Target Acquisition Battery, 1-39 Field Artillery Battalion. At the time of his arrest, he was stationed at Fort Bragg, near Fayetteville, North Carolina, holding the rank of Specialist Four (E-4) and serving as a cook assigned to 3rd Battalion, 504th Parachute Infantry Regiment, 82nd Airborne.

During his court-martial, his mother Lizzie Hurd and sister testified that he had been abused by his stepfather as a child. Colonel David Armitage, a military forensic psychiatrist, also testified that in Gray's early life he had experienced:

Fairly substantial socioeconomic deprivation, multiple male figures in the home, multiple physical moves, living in substandard poverty conditions, [and] circumstances where the electric lights were turned out by the electric company because bills were not paid. He had a step-parent [stepfather] at one time who was extremely abusive to his mother and abusive to himself [Gray], using belts on him to the point of inflicting injury, drawing blood.

== Crimes ==
On April 27, 1986, Gray murdered civilian Linda Jean Coats, age 23, a student at nearby Campbell University. On December 11, 1986, Gray abducted, raped, and murdered a second civilian, Tammy Cofer Wilson, age 18.

On December 15, 1986, Gray abducted, raped, sodomized, and murdered Private Laura Lee Vickery-Clay, age 18. She disappeared from Fort Bragg. Two witnesses saw her at a local K-mart with a man later identified as Gray. Vickery-Clay's car was found the next morning, a block from her home. It appeared to have been driven through the woods. The driver's seat was set farther back than necessary for Vickery-Clay to drive. Three of Gray's fingerprints were found on the hood of the car.

On January 17, 1987, a soldier discovered Vickery-Clay's half-naked and decomposed body in the woods near Fort Bragg. She had been raped, sodomized, and shot in the neck, forehead, chest, and back. She had also suffered blunt force trauma to various parts of her body. The murder weapon, a .22 caliber pistol that Gray had stolen in November 1986, was found 60 feet from the victim's body.

On January 3, 1987, Gray raped and attempted to murder Private Maryann Lang Nameth, age 19. Gray entered her barracks room under the pretense of notification of a party that he did not want to leave on the barracks notification board. Once inside, Gray grabbed Nameth, held a knife to her throat, and asked for her military field gear. Gray tied Nameth's hands behind her, removed her underclothing, and raped her. Gray then stabbed her repeatedly in the neck and on the side of her body, threatening to return and kill her if she screamed. Nameth suffered a lacerated trachea and a collapsed lung, but she survived. When Gray's photograph appeared in the news following his arrest for another crime, Nameth identified him as her assailant.

Three days later, on January 6, Gray raped, sodomized, robbed, and murdered a third civilian, Kimberly Ann Ruggles, age 23. Ruggles, a local cab driver, was dispatched to Gray's address to pick up a passenger named "Ron" on the evening of January 6. In the early morning of January 7, military police officers on routine patrol discovered Ruggles' empty cab parked at the edge of the woods. Her nude body was discovered a short distance away. She had been stabbed seven times, as well as raped, sodomized and beaten.

Ruggles' mouth had been gagged with a cloth belt that matched a pair of black karate pants other police officers had found in Gray's possession hours earlier. Gray's fingerprints were on the interior door handle of Ruggles' taxi, and Ruggles' fingerprints were found on money in Gray's possession. Gray's footprints were also found at the scene of the crime.

=== List of victims ===
Victim	Date
Linda Jean Coats, 23	April 27, 1986
Tammy Cofer Wilson, 18	December 11, 1986
Private Laura Lee Vickery-Clay, 18	December 15, 1986
Private Maryann Lang Nameth, 19	January 3, 1987
Kimberly Ann Ruggles, 23	January 6, 1987

== Criminal case ==
In November 1987, Gray pleaded guilty in Cumberland County Superior Court to 22 felonies: two counts of second degree murder (Coats and Wilson), two counts of first degree burglary, five counts of first degree rape, five counts of a first degree sexual offense, one count of attempted first degree rape, three counts of second degree kidnapping, two counts of robbery with a dangerous weapon, and one count each of assault with a deadly weapon with intent to kill and inflicting serious injury. He was sentenced to eight life sentences, including three to be served consecutively.

A military court also tried Gray. The general court-martial lasted from December 1987 until April 1988 and was composed of commissioned and enlisted soldiers at Fort Bragg. Gray was convicted of 12 charges, including the premeditated murders of Ruggles and Vickery-Clay, the attempted premeditated murder of Lang Nameth, three rapes, two robberies, and two counts of forcible sodomy. On April 12, 1988, he was unanimously sentenced to death. In addition, he was dishonorably discharged, ordered to forfeit all of his pay and allowances, and reduced in rank to Private E-1. On July 29, 1988, the Commanding General of the 82nd Airborne Division approved the sentence. Gray was 22 at the time of his sentencing.

Gray remains on death row at the United States Disciplinary Barracks, Fort Leavenworth, Kansas. As a United States Armed Forces member, Gray cannot be executed until the president approves the death sentence. On July 28, 2008, President George W. Bush approved Gray's execution, making Gray the first service member sentenced to death since 1961. One month later, Army Secretary Pete Geren set the execution date as December 10, 2008, and ordered that Gray be put to death by lethal injection at the Federal Correctional Complex in Terre Haute, Indiana. The military released the news of Gray's execution date on November 20, 2008. United States Army Corrections Command will be responsible for conducting the execution, based on an agreement with the Federal Bureau of Prisons.

== Appeals ==
Immediately following Gray's court-martial, the trial records were forwarded to Defense Appellate Division and received by them on August 8, 1988. Counsel filed initial pleadings with the Court of Military Review on September 15, 1989. On February 13, 1990, that court ordered a sanity board, which, on June 30, 1990, found that Gray was responsible at the time of the offenses and that he was competent to understand his trial and the present appellate proceedings. On July 20, 1990, the Government Appellate Division answered Gray's assignment of errors.

On December 27, 1990, Gray filed a motion with the Court of Military Review requesting that they court order the Government to provide $15,000 for an expert psychiatrist, a death penalty qualified attorney and an investigator. Oral arguments were heard on the motion in January 1991. On March 12, 1991, the Court of Military Review denied the motion. Gray renewed his request for a psychiatrist and an investigator on August 7, 1991, but the Court of Military Review denied it on August 23, 1991. On September 12, 1991, Gray filed a writ-appeal petition requesting that this court order the government to provide $10,000 and an emergency stay of the proceedings before the Court of Military Review. On October 18, 1991, this court denied the writ-appeal petition and the stay application.

On December 16, 1991, Gray filed a motion with the Court of Military Review requesting that military authorities perform the court order additional medical and psychological tests. On December 31, 1991, that court granted Gray's request and ordered a Magnetic Resonance Imaging (MRI) scan of the brain, a 20-channel scalp electrode, sleep-deprived EEG, and a SPECT scan of his brain, as well as intellectual, academic, psychological, and personality tests. On February 18, 1992, a report based on these tests was completed by Captain Fred H. Brown Jr., a clinical psychologist from Womack Army Medical Center at Fort Bragg. Brown stated in an affidavit filed with the appellate court that Gray was sane during the offenses and the proceedings. On March 9, 1992, counsel filed a petition for a new trial based on newly discovered evidence of lack of mental responsibility.

On February 26, 1992, Gray filed a supplementary assignment of errors, to which the Government responded on March 27, 1992. On April 8, 1992, the Court of Military Review heard oral arguments, and on December 15, 1992, denied the petition for a new trial and affirmed the findings and sentence. On December 30, 1992, Gray filed a motion renewing his request for funds for an expert investigator and a behavioral neurologist. Gray filed a petition to reconsider this decision on January 4, 1993. The Court of Military Review heard oral arguments on the motion for funding on January 21, 1993, and denied the motion for funding and the petition for reconsideration on January 22, 1993.

On February 11, 1993, Gray filed a motion and suggestion for reconsideration by the court sitting en banc of the denial of funding and a motion and suggestion for reconsideration by the court sitting en banc of the decision of December 15, 1992. On March 11, 1993, the court denied both motions and the suggestions for reconsideration en banc, but granted a motion allowing Gray to file a supplemental assignment of errors (XXVIII-LVI). The Government answered this assignment of errors on April 12, 1993. On June 9, 1993, the Court of Military Review again affirmed the findings and sentence. Gray filed a motion for reconsideration on June 28, 1993, which the court denied on June 30, 1993.

With Gray's sentence affirmed by the President and the warrant issued by the Secretary of the Army, the execution was scheduled for December 10, 2008. Army spokesman Lt. Col. George Wright said on November 20 (the date when the execution date was announced) that Gray had two legal options remaining: filing a petition with a federal appellate court to stay the execution, or requesting that the president reconsider approval of the execution. On November 26, 2008, a federal judge granted Gray a stay of execution to allow time for further appeals. On January 26, 2012, the U.S. Army Court of Criminal Appeals denied relief.

On September 29, 2015, a judge ruled against Gray's arguments of his appeal thus ending the long-running appeal set into motion by Bush's approval of Gray's sentence in 2008.

On November 13, 2017, the United States Court of Appeals for the Armed Forces issued a per curiam opinion denying Gray's writ of error coram nobis with prejudice for lack of jurisdiction.

On June 28, 2018, the United States Supreme Court declined to hear Gray's case, without giving a reason.

== See also ==
- Capital punishment by the United States military
- John A. Bennett, the last person to be executed by the U.S. military
- List of death row inmates in the United States
- List of serial killers in the United States
