= Jeremiah McCray =

Executed American serial killer

- McCray being interrogated shortly after his arrest
- Born: 1935; Buchanan, Georgia, U.S.
- Died: April 18, 1958 (aged 23); Virginia State Penitentiary, Virginia, U.S.
- Status: Executed by electrocution
- Convictions: Virginia; First degree murder Pennsylvania; Burglary; Larceny
- Penalty: Virginia; Death; Pennsylvania; One year imprisonment

Details
- Victims: 5
- Span of crimes: 1956–1958
- Country: United States
- States: Alabama, Ohio, Georgia, Virginia
- Date apprehended: For the final time on February 3, 1958

Jeremiah McCray (1935 – April 18, 1958) was an American serial killer, rapist, and burglar who committed five murders across four states from 1956 to 1958, with most of his victims being elderly women whom he killed during robberies. Convicted and sentenced to death for his final murder in Virginia, McCray was executed a few weeks later.

== Early life ==
Little is known about McCray's life. Born in 1935 in Buchanan, Georgia, he was the son of Black sharecroppers and supposedly had as many as twenty brothers. McCray claimed that he studied in school for about three years, but never learned to read or write. Eventually, he dropped out altogether and started working as an itinerant farm laborer, but would occasionally turn to thefts and burglaries if he desperately needed money.

== Murders ==
In early 1956, McCray was working on a farm in Talladega, Alabama, when he was approached by an acquaintance who claimed that he knew a place from where they could steal some cash. Deciding to accompany him, the pair traveled to Anniston on February 27, where they broke into the home of 73-year-old Daisy F. Gilbert. Upon encountering her, the two men murdered her by beating her to death with sticks before stealing $80 and a pistol from the house and fleeing. Gilbert's body was later discovered by her daughter-in-law, Ezmi Clifford, who immediately notified the authorities. A few days later, Gilbert's adopted son Kenneth, who worked at a Standard Oil plantation in Venezuela, went back to Alabama to accompany his wife, who was considered the prime suspect in the case. Up until McCray's arrest, Ezmi was repeatedly called in for questioning by authorities and was regarded with suspicion by the locals, which greatly impacted her and her family's social life and led to friends and acquaintances severing ties with her.

After Gilbert's murder, McCray is not known to have committed any further violent crimes until July 1, 1957, when he and another acquaintance broke into a small home in Washington Court House, Ohio, where they killed 86-year-old Sarah DeWitt. (Note: The exact murder weapon used by McCray has not been determined – in his confessions, he claimed to have used a hammer, while authorities said that DeWitt had been killed with a hatchet. This discrepancy has never been clarified.) Afterwards, the pair stole $250 and left. McCray then celebrated Independence Day at his home in Alabama, and three days later, he traveled to Atlanta, Georgia, where he was hired to do some work for 79-year-old Carrie B. Hanbury. Upon arriving, McCray grabbed a shovel and beat to death her 53-year-old son, Robert, on the porch. He then entered into the house and proceeded to attack Carrie with a flashlight and a screwdriver, beating and stabbing her into unconsciousness. Believing she was dead, McCray stole $90, an electric and safety razor, and two men's shirts from the house before fleeing. Robert's body was later found by a newspaper delivery boy, and after authorities searched the house, they located the still-unconscious Carrie inside. She was then driven to hospital and had her injuries treated for the next few weeks – in the end, she managed to survive, but was left physically disabled and mentally scarred from the attack.

=== Burglary arrest, release, and Virginia murders ===
In July 1957, McCray broke into a home in Freedom Township, Pennsylvania, stealing several watches and a constable's badge, which he then attempted to sell on the street. To his surprise, the homeowner, Roscoe Shindledecker, managed to track him down and arrest him. Soon afterwards, McCray, who falsely listed his age as 28, was charged with one count of burglary and one count of larceny. He was convicted of both and sentenced to a year in prison, but was paroled in early January 1958.

On January 8 to 9, McCray was walking around Colonial Heights, Virginia, when he noticed a young man tending to a barn outside of his house. He went up and knocked on the front door, and when nobody answered, he broke into the house and attempted to hide in a wardrobe in one of the bedrooms. When he failed to do so, he armed himself with a knife and broke it open – at that time, 74-year-old Virginia Maclin Stevens entered the room and asked him what he was doing. After he replied that her elderly brother had supposedly sent him to get something, Stevens said that she would go and check in with him, causing McCray to stab her in the neck with the knife, severing her spinal cord. As she was still alive, he proceeded to stomp on her before stabbing her several times in the head and body. After this, McCray left the house and hitched a ride to Richmond and then to Fredericksburg, where he was later arrested for loitering. Although he was questioned as a suspect in the Stevens case, McCray would be cleared by investigators after he passed two polygraph tests, claiming that he had nothing to do with the murder. As a result, Stevens' son Walter was detained as the prime suspect, remaining in custody until January 22, when all charges against him were dropped.

By the following month, McCray had moved into a house in Ladysmith, which was occupied by several other residents, among whom was a 20-year-old fellow laborer by the name of Rush Reager. On February 2, McCray talked with him about helping him rob and tie up 49-year-old Jeanette M. Griffin, a widow who lived a few houses away from them, to which Reager agreed. That same night, Reager went to the house, tied Griffin up in the kitchen, and then went back to tell McCray, who then traveled with him to the house. Once there, the two men took turns raping her before McCray ultimately beat Griffin to death with sticks of firewood. The pair then ransacked the house and left, with McCray stealing a pair of men's pants. He then returned to the house he was residing in, where he washed his bloodied pair of pants in the washbasin.

== Arrest and confessions ==
The next morning, Griffin's 14-year-old son Jimmy found his mother's body and immediately notified the police. After interviewing several witnesses, the people residing in the same house as McCray said that he had apparently gone somewhere on the night of the murder, and when he returned, he had a new pair of pants similar to the one stolen from the Griffin household. Due to this, both he and Reager were arrested and charged with the crime, with the former being brought for interrogation at the police barracks in Richmond.

During this interrogation, McCray shocked investigators by suddenly admitting to four other murders, including the Stevens murder of which he had previously been cleared. While he did not provide an abundant amount of detail and refused to name the accomplices in the earlier slayings, the police eventually managed to connect him with the respective murders. Due to his modus operandi, McCray was investigated for possible additional crimes committed around the Atlanta area from 1955 to 1957, but no further accusations were leveled against him due to lack of evidence.

== Trial, imprisonment, and execution ==
While he was charged with murder in Virginia and Alabama, it was decided that McCray's first trial would take place in the former since he was already jailed there. Per court procedure, he was ordered to undergo a psychiatric evaluation at a hospital in Bowling Green, where he was to be examined by three court-appointed psychiatrists. The results showed that while he was of low intelligence, McCray could differentiate between right from wrong, and was thus ruled sane to stand trial. At a preliminary hearing, he pleaded guilty but later changed his plea to not guilty, which meant that he would be tried before a jury.

During the murder trial, the prosecution brought forward a dozen witnesses to testify about what had transpired on the day of Griffin's murder, including her own son and the family with which McCray lived. In addition, an overwhelming amount of evidence was presented against the defendant, ranging from the stolen clothing to his mysterious blood stains on McCray's shoes, shirt, and ear. When placed under cross-examination, McCray admitted to physically assaulting and robbing Griffin but claimed that he did not rape her and was unsure whether he had actually killed her or not. In the end, he was found unanimously guilty on all counts and sentenced to death. When asked if he had something to say, McCray simply replied that he hoped everyone was satisfied with the verdict. At that time, his court-appointed attorney claimed that he did not plan to pursue further appeals at the time.

On April 10, 1958, McCray's plea for clemency was denied by Governor J. Lindsay Almond, setting his execution date for April 18. On the aforementioned date, he was executed at the Virginia State Penitentiary's electric chair. Two months later, Reager was convicted for rape for his role in the Griffin case and was sentenced to life imprisonment.

== See also ==
- Capital punishment in Virginia
- List of people executed in Virginia (pre-1972)
- List of people executed in the United States in 1958
- List of serial killers in the United States
