= United States Disciplinary Barracks =

Military correction facility in Fort Leavenworth, KS

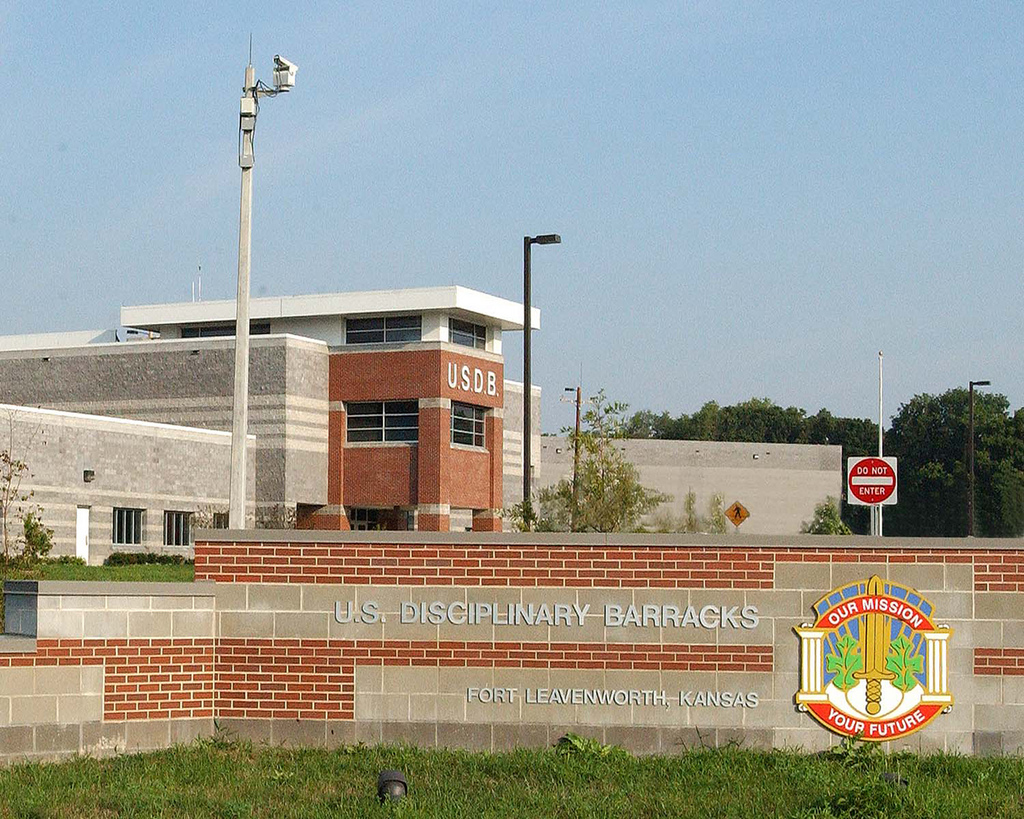
- The exterior of the USDB in 2002

- Location in Kansas
- Location: Fort Leavenworth, Kansas, U.S.; 39°22′42″N 94°56′07″W
- Status: Operational
- Security class: Minimum-maximum security, Level III (Maximum Security)
- Capacity: 515
- Population: 440
- Opened: 1874, rebuilt in 2002
- Managed by: United States Army Corrections Command
- Director: Commandant: Colonel Andrew Sergent

The United States Disciplinary Barracks (USDB), colloquially known as Leavenworth, is a military correctional facility located at Fort Leavenworth, a United States Army post in Kansas. It is one of two major prisons at Fort Leavenworth, the other being the Midwest Joint Regional Correctional Facility, which opened on 5 October 2010. Together the facilities make up the Military Corrections Complex, which is under the command of its commandant, who holds the rank of colonel and serves as both the Army Corrections Brigade commander and the deputy commander of the United States Army Corrections Command.

The USDB is the U.S. military's only maximum-security facility that houses male service members convicted at court-martial for violations of the Uniform Code of Military Justice. Only male service members with sentences over ten years are confined to the USDB. Those with sentences under ten years are confined in smaller facilities, such as the nearby Midwest Joint Regional Correctional Facility or the Naval Consolidated Brig in Chesapeake, Virginia. The facility contains the U.S. military death row for male servicemembers sentenced to death, and USDB staff are responsible for carrying out executions, though no execution chamber exists at the facility.

Corrections personnel at the facility are Army Corrections Specialists (MOS 31E) trained at the U.S. Army Military Police school located at Fort Leonard Wood, Missouri, as well as Marine Corps and Air Force corrections personnel.

Female prisoners from all branches of the Department of Defense are typically incarcerated in the Naval Consolidated Brig, Miramar, instead of the USDB, regardless of sentence.

== First facility ==
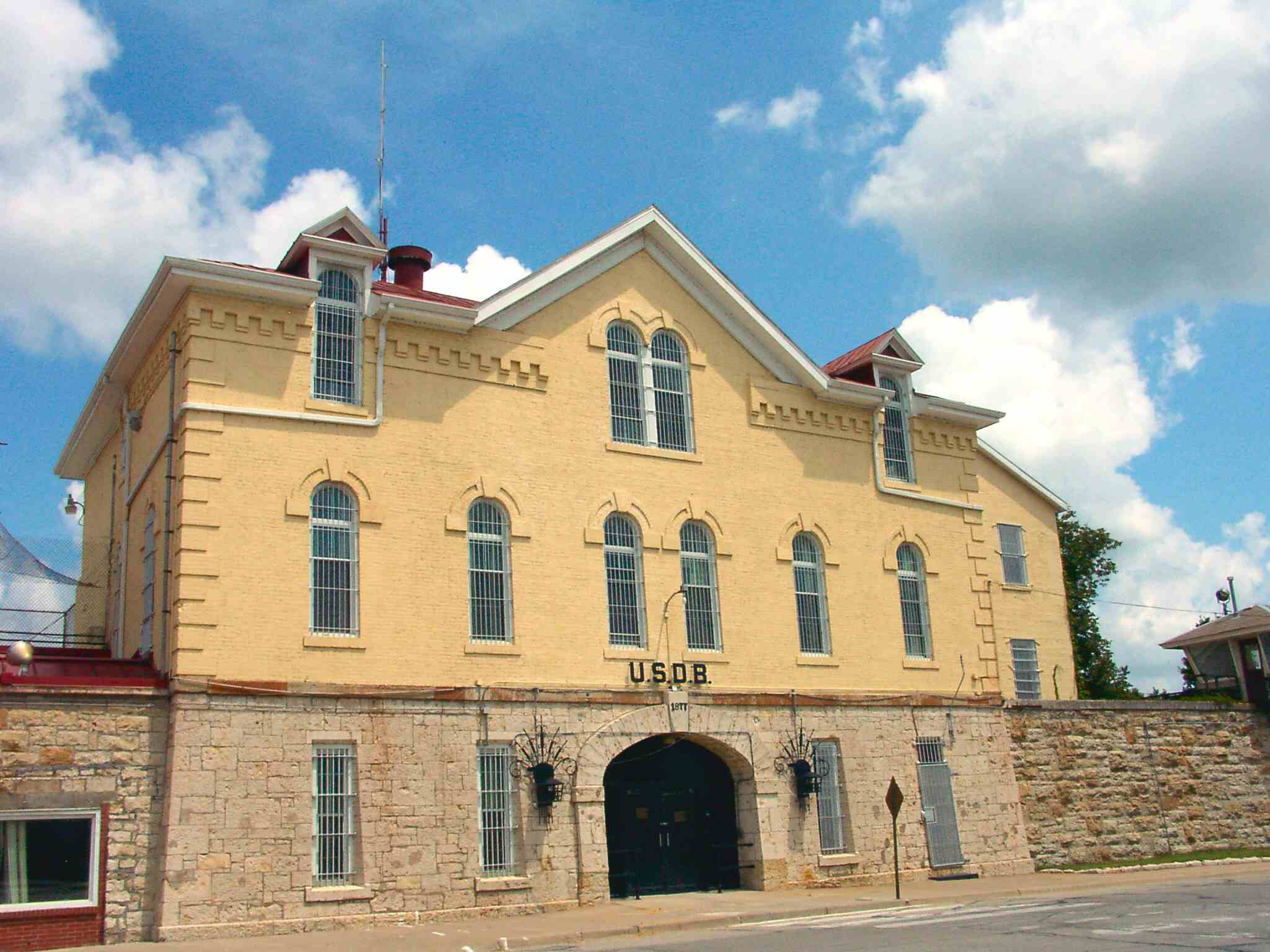
Main gateway into the 1877 disciplinary barracks as of 2007. Previously serving as administrative space, the building now has other uses, including a base eatery.

Originally known as the United States Military Prison, the USDB was established by Act of Congress in 1874. Prisoners were used for the bulk of the construction, which began in 1875 and was completed in 1921. The facility was able to house up to 1,500 prisoners. From 1895 until 1903, prisoners from the USDB were used to construct the nearby United States Penitentiary, Leavenworth.

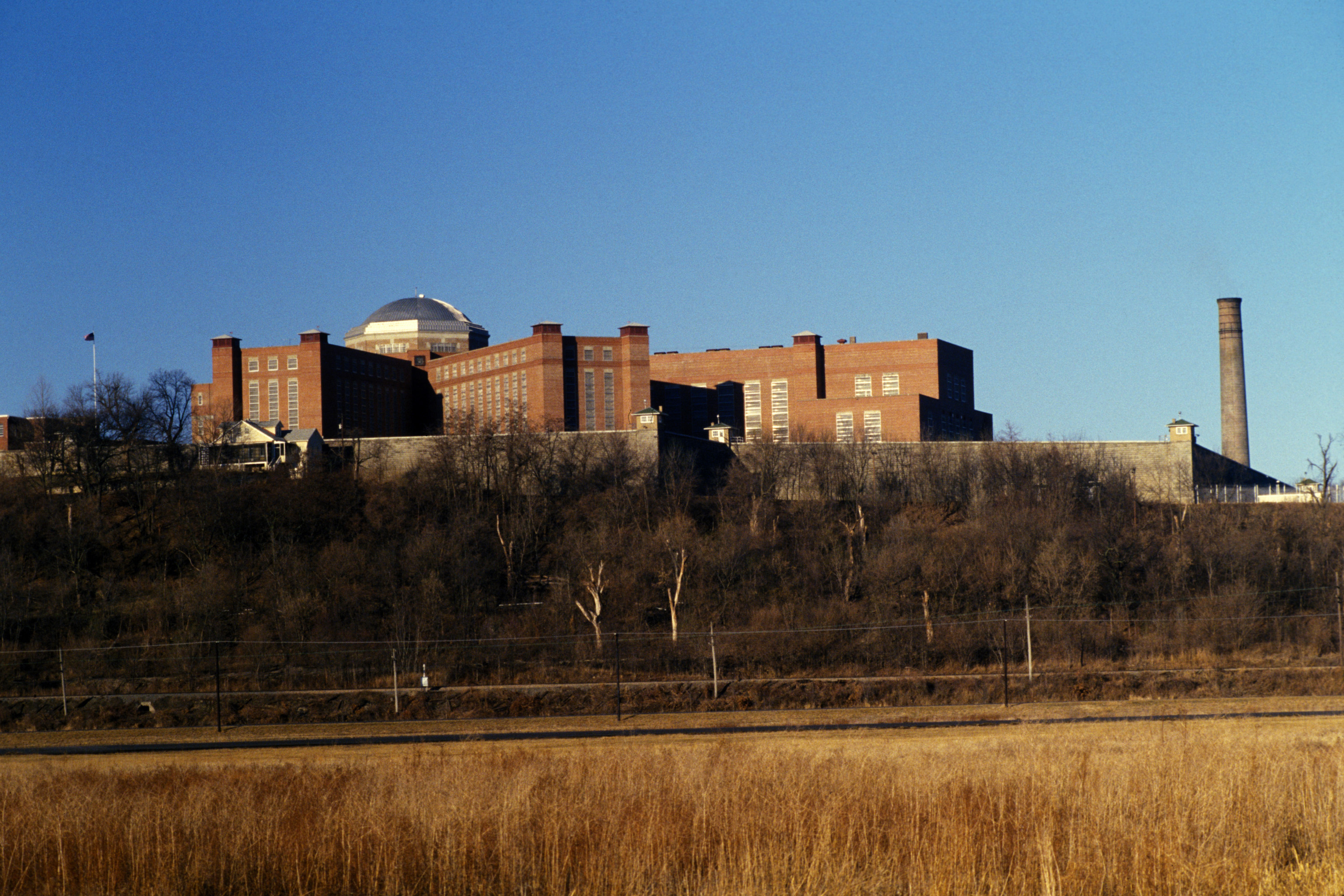
The original 19th century USDB (c.1977). Dubbed "The Castle" or "Little Top" due to its size and location, it was demolished in 2004.

The original USDB followed the Pennsylvania plan modeling on a layout of the Eastern State Penitentiary where cell blocks radiated out from a central structure. Individual cells were relatively isolated. In contrast, the civilian prison, modeled on the Auburn Correctional Facility in New York, reflected a newer concept where prisoners were housed in a large rectangular building where there was a certain amount of communal living. The site covered 12 acres (4.9 ha) with walls from 16 to 41 feet (4.9 to 12.5 m) high.

The original USDB was Fort Leavenworth's biggest and tallest building sited at the corner of McPherson Avenue and Scott Avenue on bluffs above the Missouri River (39°21′36.50″N 94°55′0.53″W). The old domed building was nicknamed "Little Top" in contrast to the domed federal prison 2 1/2 miles (4.0 km) south which was nicknamed the "Big Top".

During World War I, two brothers named Joseph and Michael Hofer died at Fort Leavenworth in 1918 after refusing to enlist or wear uniforms after they were drafted under the Selective Service Act of 1917. The pair of conscientious objectors, who were Christian Hutterites, were held in solitary confinement, beaten, and starved to death.

In 1988 the prison had 1,450 prisoners, including 21 women. This included 42 officers, the highest ranking being a lieutenant colonel. By 2014, all female prisoners had been moved to NAVCONBRIG Miramar. In August 1988, an inmate named David Newman escaped after hiding in Pope Hall while on Wood Shop detail. He assembled a ladder, kicked out a window and climbed over the wall between Towers 3 and 4. He was captured four days later in Kansas City. Following the escape, bars were placed on the windows of all buildings within the complex and interior chain link with razor wire top guard was placed between the buildings and the exterior stone walls. Shortly before the detention barracks closed, more than 300 inmates refused lockdown on 12 May 1995. The uprising was put down by 150 correction officers.

In 2002, Gail Dillon of Airman magazine wrote of the old detention barracks:

A visitor would immediately notice the medieval ambiance of this institution – the well-worn native stone and brick walls constructed by long-forgotten inmates when 'hard labor' meant exactly that – have witnessed thousands of inmates' prayers, curses, and pleas over the past 128 years" and that entering the facility was "like stepping back in time or suddenly being part of a kitschy movie set about a prison bust.

In the late 1990s, work began on a new purpose-built military detention center on the site of the former USDB Farm Colony. The largest buildings of the original barracks ("The Castle") were torn down in 2004. The walls and ten of the buildings in the original location—including Pope Hall—have been converted or are in the process of being converted to other uses at Fort Leavenworth. The prison's original commandant's house still remains.

== Current facility ==
The new state-of-the-art, 515-bed, disciplinary barrack, which cost $67.8 million ($113 million in 2024 dollars), became operational in September 2002. It was built about a mile north of the original USDB at Fort Leavenworth. The new 51 acres (210,000 m^{2}) site is enclosed by two separate 14-foot (4.3 m) high fences. There are three housing units, each of which can accommodate up to 142 prisoners. The units, described as "bow ties", are two-tiered, connected triangular shaped domiciles. The cells in the new facility have solid doors and a window. There are no bars. The new facility is said to be much quieter than the old one and is preferred by inmates. Colonel Colleen L. McGuire, the first female commandant of the USDB, said in 2002 that the new facility is "much more efficient in design and layout – much brighter and lighter."

In 2009, the Barracks, along with the Standish Maximum Correctional Facility in Michigan, were being considered for relocation of 220 prisoners from the Guantanamo Bay detention camp. Kansas officials, including both U.S. Senators, objected to the transfer; Pat Roberts stated that the transfer would require 2,000 privately owned acres around the fort to be acquired through the use of eminent domain to establish a stand-off zone because the prison is on the perimeter of the fort.

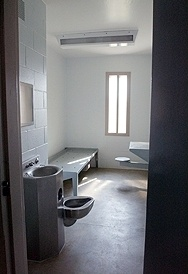
Prison cell

The new prison reflects current prison design of smaller low-rise separate buildings where prisoners can be more easily isolated from the general population. In 2012 the facility received a 100% rating and the accolades from an assessment team from the American Correctional Association (ACA) (who have been auditing the sites since 1988). Three independent evaluators visited the prison facilities to check on more than 500 standards, including mental health services, safety issues, and other aspects of the facility related to humane treatment of inmates. The USDB received a top rating in all of the standards despite having a portion of its staffing deployed to Iraq. The facility has maintained this rating and score on each of its subsequent triennial inspections.

The USDB is staffed by both "green-suiters," Service Members assigned to the Army Corrections Brigade as well as DoD liaisons from each branch, and DA Civilians. Many soldiers have a designated Military Occupational Specialty 31E, corrections specialists, while treatment and support staff range from food services to occupational therapists and chaplains. The unit is designated a subordinate unit under Army Corrections Command, which itself was activated in Washington, D.C., in 2007 under the Provost Marshal General as a Field Operating Agency and further redesignated a Direct Reporting Unit to Headquarters, Department of the Army in 2023 with its headquarters at Fort Leavenworth, KS.

In August 2010, two inmates overpowered an MP guard in the Special Housing Unit. They then were joined by 11 others. The guard was freed by a special tactics unit which retook control of the Special Housing Unit. Several inmates and one rescuer sustained non-life-threatening injuries in the incident. This was the first such incident in the new prison.

== Cemetery ==
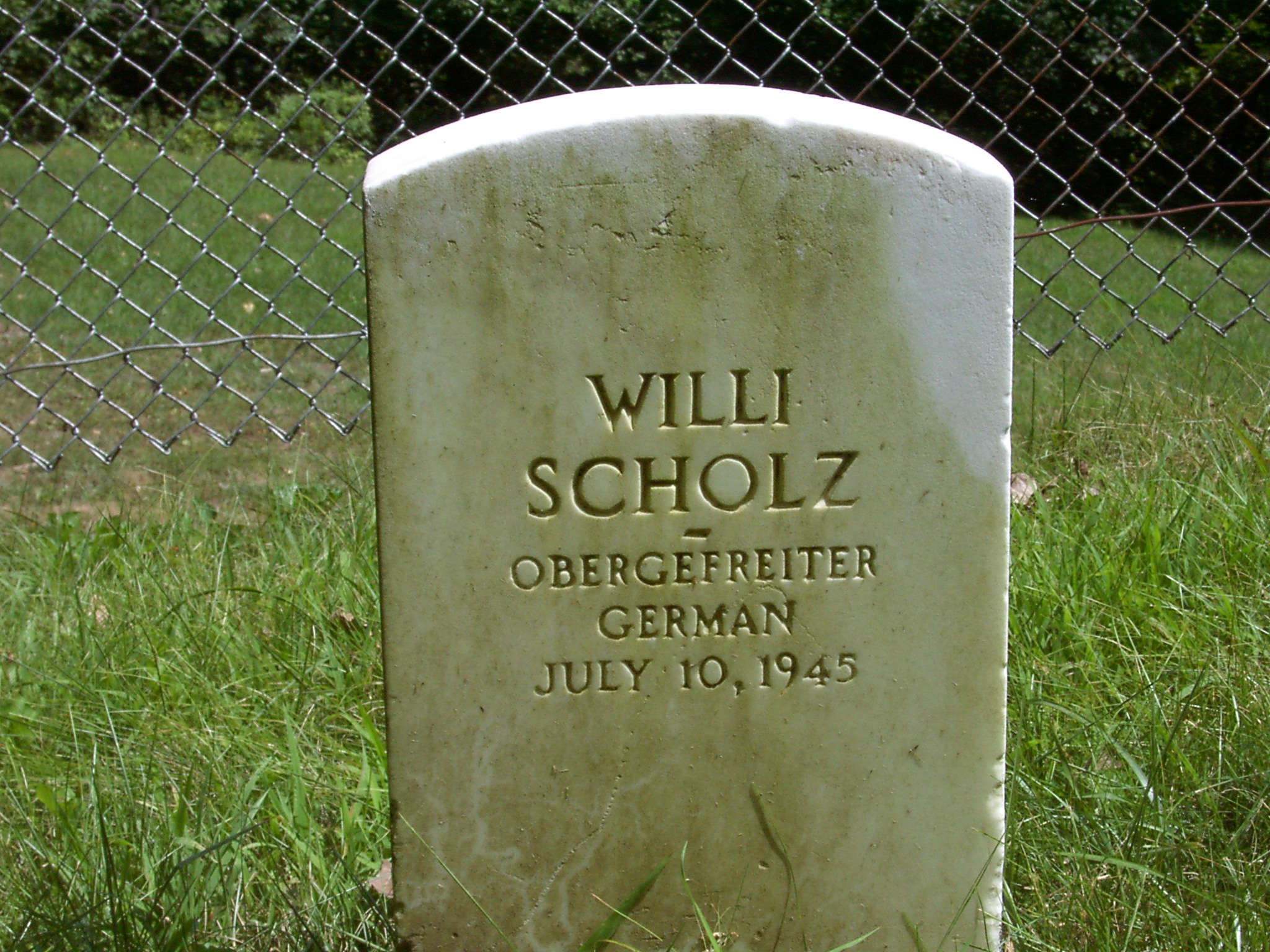
Headstone of a German prisoner at the cemetery; he and four others were executed for lynching fellow prisoner Johannes Kunze

Deceased prisoners who are not claimed by their family members are buried near the original USDB. There are 300 graves dating from approximately 1894 to 1957, 56 of which are unmarked and 14 that belong to German prisoners of war executed for the murder of fellow POWs. The executions were carried out in 1945, in three groups: five on 10 July, two on 14 July, and seven on 25 August. The most recent interment in the cemetery was in May 2023.

== Capital punishment ==
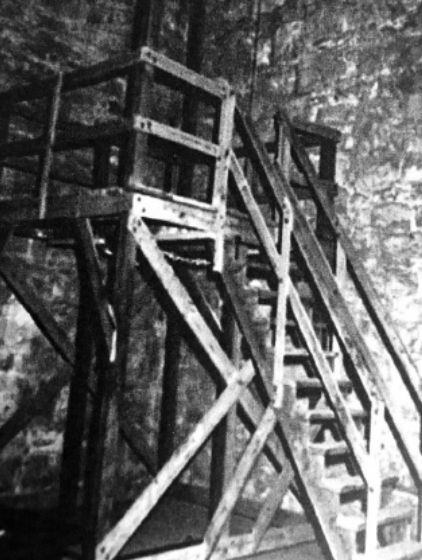
The gallows at the old U.S. Disciplinary Barracks

The USDB contains the death row for the U.S. military's male prisoners. Those on the USDB death row have been convicted of one or more capital offenses and sentenced to death by a court-martial under the UCMJ. Within the prison, death row is located in an isolated corridor away from other inmates. The modern USDB facility does not have an execution chamber.

Since 1945, there have been 21 executions at the USDB, including 14 German prisoners of war executed in 1945 for murder. In the old USDB, all executions were performed by hanging, with the last execution, that of Army PFC John A. Bennett, taking place 13 April 1961. In the post-Gregg era, the Department of Defense had planned to adopt the Federal Bureau of Prisons' civilian lethal injection execution process. A never-used lethal injection chamber called the "special processing unit" was added to the USDB, with the New York Daily News describing it as "virtually identical" to the federal civilian execution chamber at U.S. Penitentiary Terre Haute, Indiana.

When the USDB was rebuilt in 2002, a death chamber was not constructed; executions were expected to take place in the federal lethal injection chamber at USP Terre Haute. In October 2026, President Donald Trump announced military executions would resume by firing squad. The following day, Acting Secretary of the Army Adam Telle announced the execution of Major Nidal Hasan would take place at Fort Hood, the site of his 2009 mass shooting, performed by a squad of 12 shooters led by the USDB Commandant.

As of October 2026, all four USDB death row inmates currently awaiting execution are former US servicemembers convicted of murder. Two have had their executions approved by the President: Ronald Gray, who has been on death row since 1988, had his death sentence approved by George W. Bush on 28 July 2008. Nidal Hasan, who has been on death row since 2013, had his death sentence approved by Donald Trump on 5 October 2026. Enemy combatants who are currently being tried before a military tribunal at Guantanamo Bay would be transferred to USDB for execution if they are convicted and sentenced to death.

== Notable inmates ==
=== Current ===
==== Death row ====
- Hasan Akbar – killed two officers and wounded 14 others while deployed to Camp Pennsylvania, Kuwait on the eve of the 2003 invasion of Iraq.
- Nidal Hasan – killed 12 soldiers (including one who was pregnant) and one civilian, and wounded more than 30 others, during the 2009 Fort Hood shooting.
- Ronald Gray – serial killer who murdered four women and raped eight others while stationed at Fort Bragg in 1986. On death row since 1988.
- Timothy Hennis – convicted in 2010 of the murders of three civilians while stationed at Fort Bragg in 1985. Was previously tried and convicted in state court in 1986 before being acquitted in 1989. After new DNA evidence linked Hennis to the murders, he was court-martialed by the U.S. Army under the dual sovereignty doctrine of the United States Constitution.

==== Non-death row ====
- Dwight J. Loving – Robbed and murdered two cab drivers in 1988 while stationed at Fort Hood. Originally sentenced to death, Loving's death sentence was commuted to life in prison without parole by President Barack Obama on 17 January 2017.
- Robert Bales – war criminal who killed 16 Afghan civilians (including nine children) and wounded six others in Afghanistan during the Kandahar massacre in 2012. Bales agreed to a plea deal during his court-martial in order to avoid a death sentence, and was sentenced to life in prison without parole.
- James P. Barker, Paul E. Cortez, and Jesse V. Spielman – war criminals who participated in the Mahmudiyah rape and killings in 2006. Serving sentences ranging from 90 to 110 years, with the possibility of parole. Their fellow soldier, accomplice, and the ringleader, Steven Dale Green, was tried in civilian court after being discharged from the military due to having antisocial personality disorder. Green was sentenced to life in prison without parole and committed suicide in prison in 2014.
- John Russell – killed five fellow soldiers at Camp Liberty in 2010. He pleaded guilty to avoid a possible death sentence and was sentenced to life in prison without parole.
- William Kreutzer Jr. – killed an officer and wounded 18 fellow soldiers at Fort Bragg when he opened fire on them in the callisthenics field during a physical training formation. He was initially sentenced to death, but his death sentence was reduced to life in prison with the possibility of parole on appeal.
- Calvin Gibbs – former Staff Sergeant and alleged leader of the "Kill Team" who perpetuated the Maywand District murders. Gibbs was convicted of three counts of murder, illegally cutting off pieces of victim corpses, and for planting weapons to make victims look like Taliban fighters. Gibbs is sentenced to life with the possibility of parole after 10 years. Gibbs apologized for the collecting of human remains, but contends the murders were justified.
- Jeremy Morlock – former Specialist and member of the "Kill Team" who perpetuated the Maywand District murders. Morlock pled guilty to three counts of premeditated murder, conspiracy, obstruction of justice, and illegal drug use. Morlock is sentenced to 24 years in prison.
- Jonathan Lee – U.S. Army soldier stationed at Joint Base Lewis‑McChord who pleaded guilty to murdering Mukilteo‑area cab driver Nicholas Hokema in Tukwila in January 2024 during an attempted desertion from the Army. At his court‑martial on 23 April 2025, Lee was sentenced to life in prison with the possibility of parole (he will not be eligible until at least 2045), and additionally received a 64‑year sentence for prior convictions of rape and sexual abuse of his stepdaughters. He will serve his sentence at the U.S. Disciplinary Barracks in Fort Leavenworth.

=== Former ===
- Michael Behenna – Iraq war veteran convicted of killing Iraqi prisoner Ali Mansur Mohamed while deployed to Iraq in 2008. Behenna was sentenced to 15 years of confinement, and was granted parole on 14 March 2014, after serving five years of his sentence. President Donald Trump granted him a full pardon on 6 May 2019.
- John A. Bennett – executed in 1961 for raping and attempting to kill an 11-year-old Austrian girl. As of 2025, Bennett is the last person to be executed by the U.S. military.
- David Bram – former Staff Sergeant and member of the "Kill Team" who perpetuated the Maywand District murders. Bram was convicted of conspiracy to commit assault and battery, failure to obey a general order, dereliction of duty, maltreatment of a subordinate, assault consummated by battery, obstruction of justice, and solicitation of another to commit murder. Bram was sentenced to 5 years in prison. Bram was released from prison on an unknown date.
- William Calley – convicted for his part in the My Lai Massacre. Originally given a life sentence, President Richard Nixon ordered the Army to transfer him from Fort Leavenworth to house arrest in Fort Benning one day after he was sentenced.
- Justin Fisher and Calvin Glover – convicted of their roles in fellow soldier Barry Winchell's murder. Fisher was released from prison in August 2006, and Glover was released on parole on 27 August 2020.
- Charles Graner – war criminal who was convicted of prisoner abuse in connection with the 2003–2004 Abu Ghraib torture and prisoner abuse scandal. Graner was sentenced to ten years of confinement, and was released on parole after serving 6.5 years of his sentence.
- Terry M. Helvey – pleaded guilty to murdering fellow sailor Allen Schindler. Has since been transferred to FCI Greenville.
- Andrew Holmes – former Private First Class and member of the "Kill Team" who perpetuated the Maywand District murders. Holmes pleaded guilty to unpremeditated murder and illegal drug use, and was sentenced to 7 years in prison. He was released from prison on 25 October 2015
- Clint Lorance – war criminal who, while commanding a combat patrol during a 2012 deployment in Afghanistan, ordered one of his soldiers to shoot three Afghan men who had approached at a high speed on a motorcycle. Two of the men died and one escaped. He was also convicted of threatening local Afghans and obstruction of justice. Lorance was sentenced to 20 years of confinement. President Donald Trump granted him clemency on 15 November 2019, and he was released from confinement the same day.
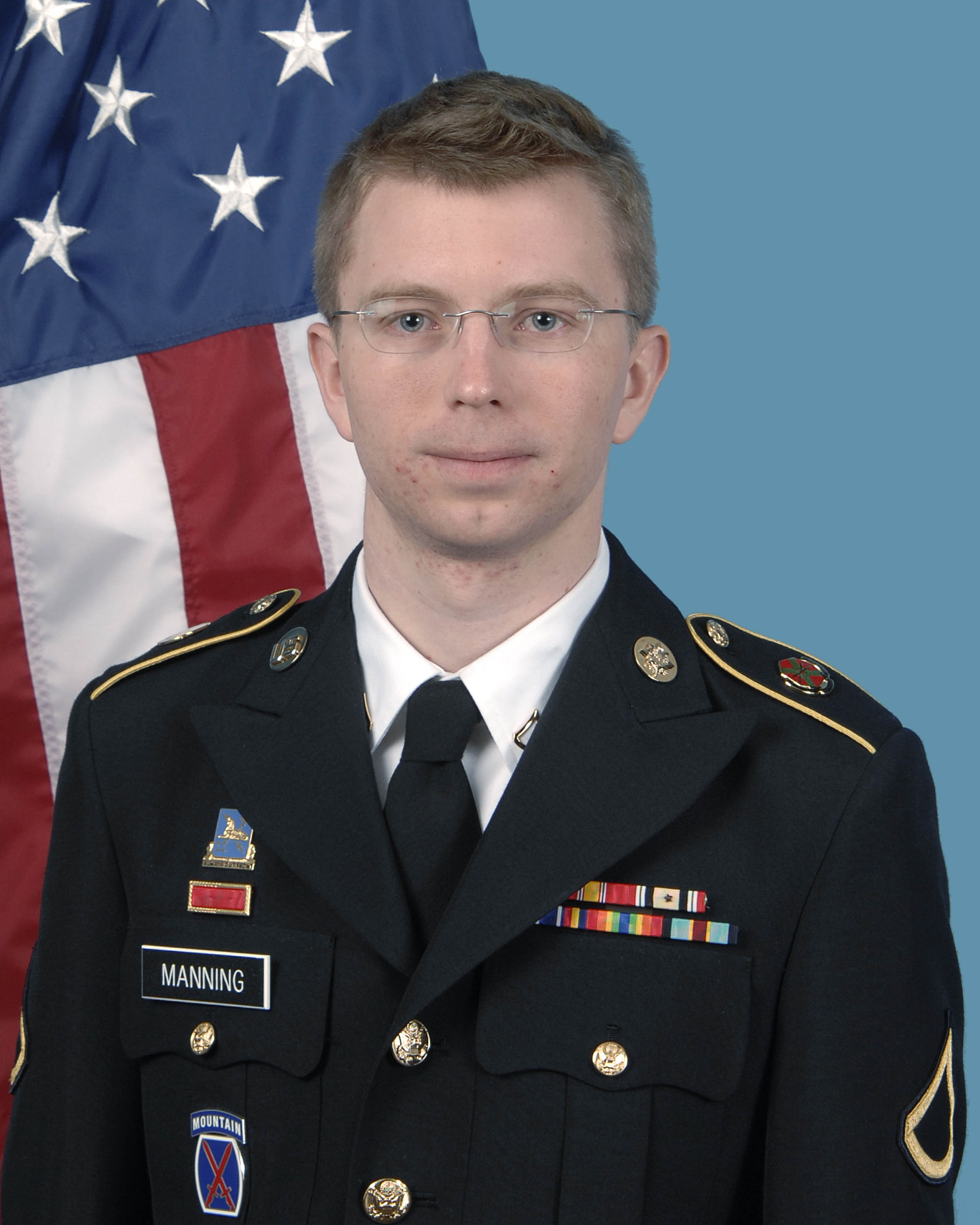
- Chelsea Manning (formerly Bradley Manning) in 2012
  Chelsea Manning (formerly Bradley Manning) – unlawfully uploaded and disseminated to the website WikiLeaks hundreds of thousands of classified diplomatic cables and military files, and a video of an Apache helicopter killing 12 civilians in Baghdad in 2007. Manning was sentenced to 35 years of confinement, and announced that she was a transgender woman after her sentencing. President Barack Obama commuted Manning's sentence on 17 January 2017, resulting in her release from the facility on 17 May 2017.
- Federico Daniel Merida – pleaded guilty to unpremeditated murder for killing Falah Zaggam, a 17-year-old Iraqi National Guard Private. Sentenced to 25 years in prison, and later transferred to a civilian prison. Paroled in 2019.
- Derrick Miller – war criminal who was convicted of the premeditated murder of an Afghan civilian during a battlefield interrogation. Originally given a life sentence, he received support from U.S. Representative Louie Gohmert, which resulted in the Army Clemency and Parole Board reviewing his sentence and reducing it to 20 years, making him eligible for parole. Miller was released on 20 May 2019, after serving eight years of his reduced sentence.
- Carl Panzram – serial killer who was convicted of larceny and served 2 years from 1908 to 1910. Later sentenced to death and executed at USP Leavenworth in 1930.
- Abraham Thomas – executed in 1958 for murdering two fellow soldiers and their girlfriends in West Germany.
- Jonathan Wells – author who wrote Icons of Evolution. Previously drafted into the Army for two years during the Vietnam War, he publicly refused to report for Reserve duty while attending college at the University of California, Berkeley. Wells was sentenced to 18 months of confinement.
- Adam Winfield – former Specialist and member of the "Kill Team" who perpetuated the Maywand District murders. Winfield pleaded guilty to involuntary manslaughter and use of an illegal controlled substance. Winfield was sentenced to three years in prison and was released in August 2012. There is evidence that Winfield's father attempted to alert the Army of the "Kill Team". Winfield says he only shot in the direction of the victims but should have done something to stop the murder.

== See also ==
- List of people executed by the United States military
- List of U.S. military prisons
- Penal military unit § United States
