= Capital punishment by the United States military =

Use of the death penalty by the U.S. military

The use of capital punishment by the United States military is a legal punishment in martial criminal justice. As of 2026, capital punishment has not been carried out by the U.S. military since 1961, when John A. Bennett was executed for the rape and attempted murder of an 11-year-old girl. The method of execution last used by the U.S. military was hanging. Until 2019, Army Regulation 190-55 specified lethal injection as the manner of execution. Since then, the choice of method has been the decision of the Secretary of the Army following a recommendation by the Provost Marshal General. In 2026, President Donald Trump directed the military to perform executions by firing squad. Capital punishment has been used by the US military in conflicts through most of American history, both for convicted US servicemembers and enemy combatants.

== Reinstatement of the military death penalty ==
The United States Court of Appeals for the Armed Forces ruled in 1983 that the military death penalty was unconstitutional, and after new standards intended to rectify the Armed Forces Court of Appeals' objections, the military death penalty was reinstated by an executive order of President Ronald Reagan the following year.

On July 28, 2008, President George W. Bush approved the execution of former United States Army Private Ronald A. Gray, who had been convicted in April 1988 of multiple murders and rapes. A month later, Secretary of the Army Pete Geren set an execution date of December 10, 2008, and ordered that Gray be put to death by lethal injection at the Federal Correctional Complex, Terre Haute. The military publicly released Gray's execution date on November 20, 2008. On November 26, however, Gray was granted a stay of execution by U.S. District Judge Richard Dean Rogers of Kansas. In December 2016, a Kansas federal judge, U.S. District Judge J. Thomas Marten, lifted Gray's stay.

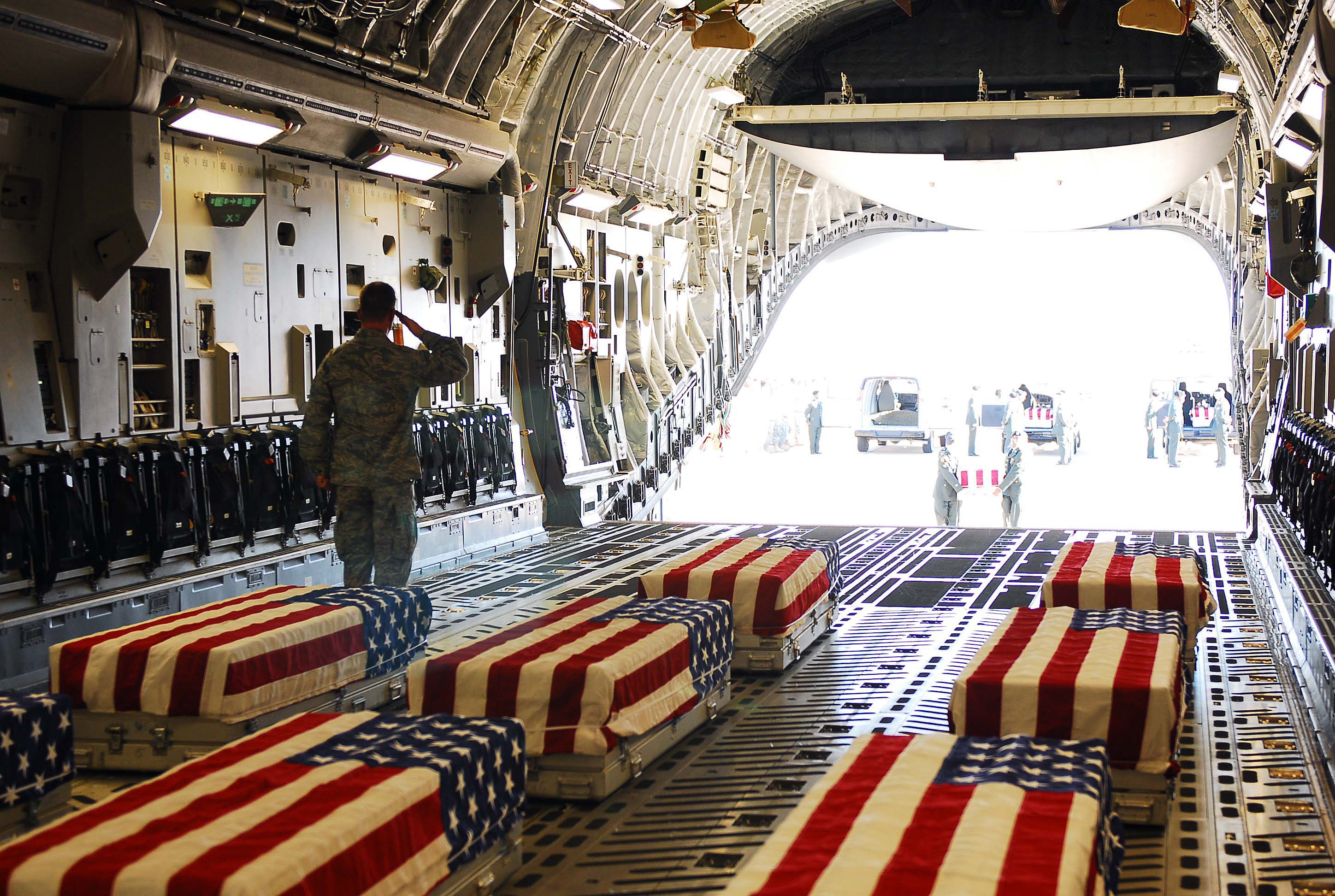
Transfer cases containing the remains of soldiers murdered by Nidal Hasan in the shooting at Fort Hood Texas, November 2009

On October 5, 2026, a spokesman for the military announced that President Donald Trump had approved the execution by firing squad of former Major Nidal Hasan, who murdered 13 people and injured 32 others during the 2009 Fort Hood shooting. Secretary of Defense Pete Hegseth had requested that Trump approve Hasan's execution in September 2025. At the time of the announcement, Hasan was one of four inmates held on death row by the US military.

== Capital crimes ==
Currently, under the Uniform Code of Military Justice, 15 offenses are punishable by death. Under the following articles of the UCMJ, the death penalty can be imposed in both times of war and peace:

- 81 (10 U.S.C. § 881) – Conspiracy
- 94 (10 U.S.C. § 894) – Mutiny or sedition
- 99 (10 U.S.C. § 899) – Misbehavior before the enemy (including cowardice)
- 100 (10 U.S.C. § 900) – Subordinate compelling surrender
- 101 (10 U.S.C. § 901) – Improper use of countersign
- 102 (10 U.S.C. § 902) – Forcing a safeguard
- 103a (10 U.S.C. § 903a) – Espionage
- 103b (10 U.S.C. § 903b) – Aiding the enemy
- 110 (10 U.S.C. § 910) – Improper hazarding of vessel
- 118 (10 U.S.C. § 918) – Murder (premeditated murder or felony murder)

Another five provisions of the UCMJ carry a death sentence only if the crime is committed during times of war:

- 85 (10 U.S.C. § 885) – Desertion
- 89 (10 U.S.C. § 889) – Assaulting a superior commissioned officer
- 90 (10 U.S.C. § 890) – Willfully disobeying a superior commissioned officer
- 95 (10 U.S.C. § 895) – Misbehavior of a sentinel or lookout
- 103 (10 U.S.C. § 103) – Lurking as a spy or acting as a spy

Under article 120, rape was once punishable by death, but the Supreme Court of the United States ruled in Coker v. Georgia and Kennedy v. Louisiana that the capital punishment for rape is unconstitutional.

== Legal process ==
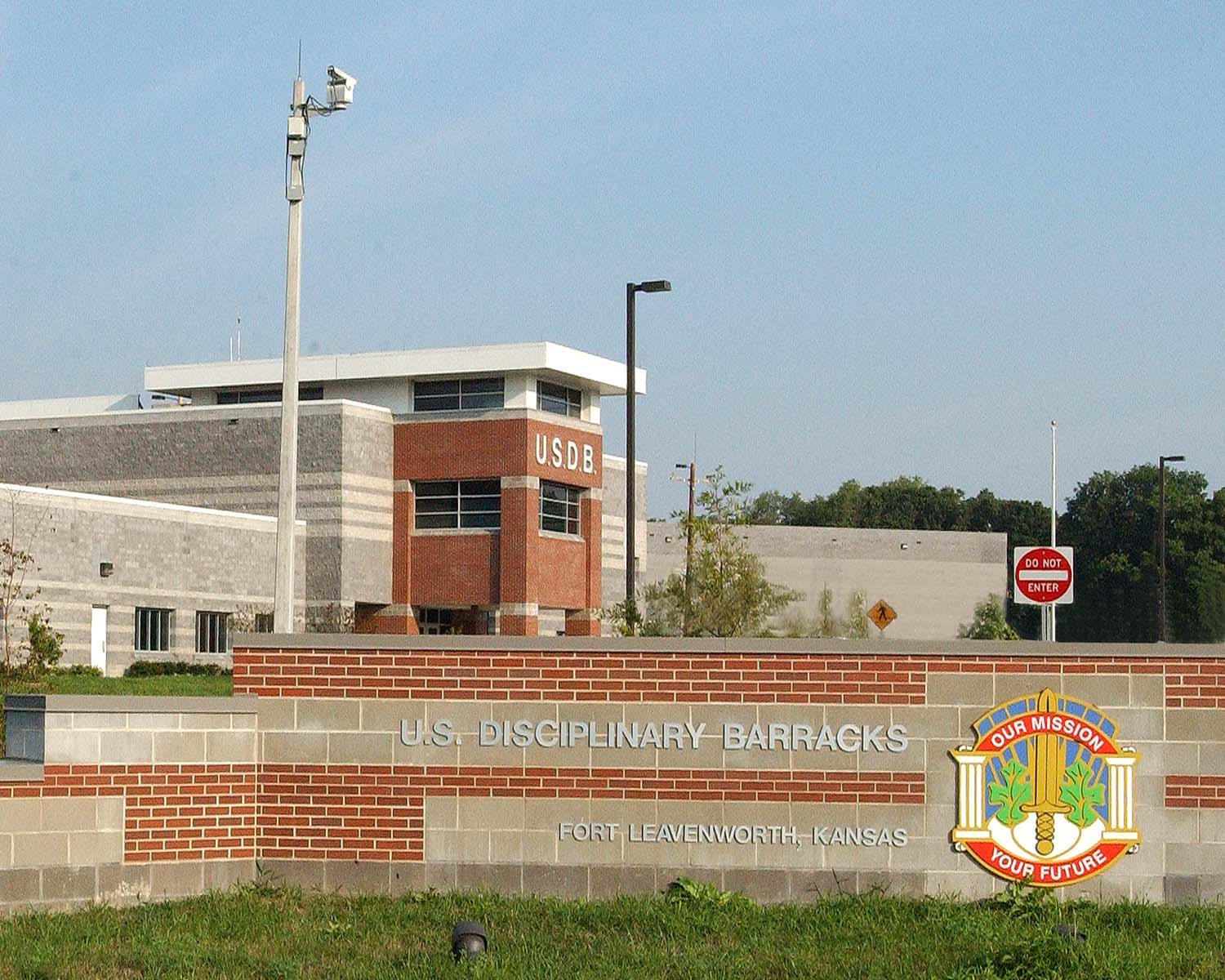
United States Disciplinary Barracks houses men on military death row.

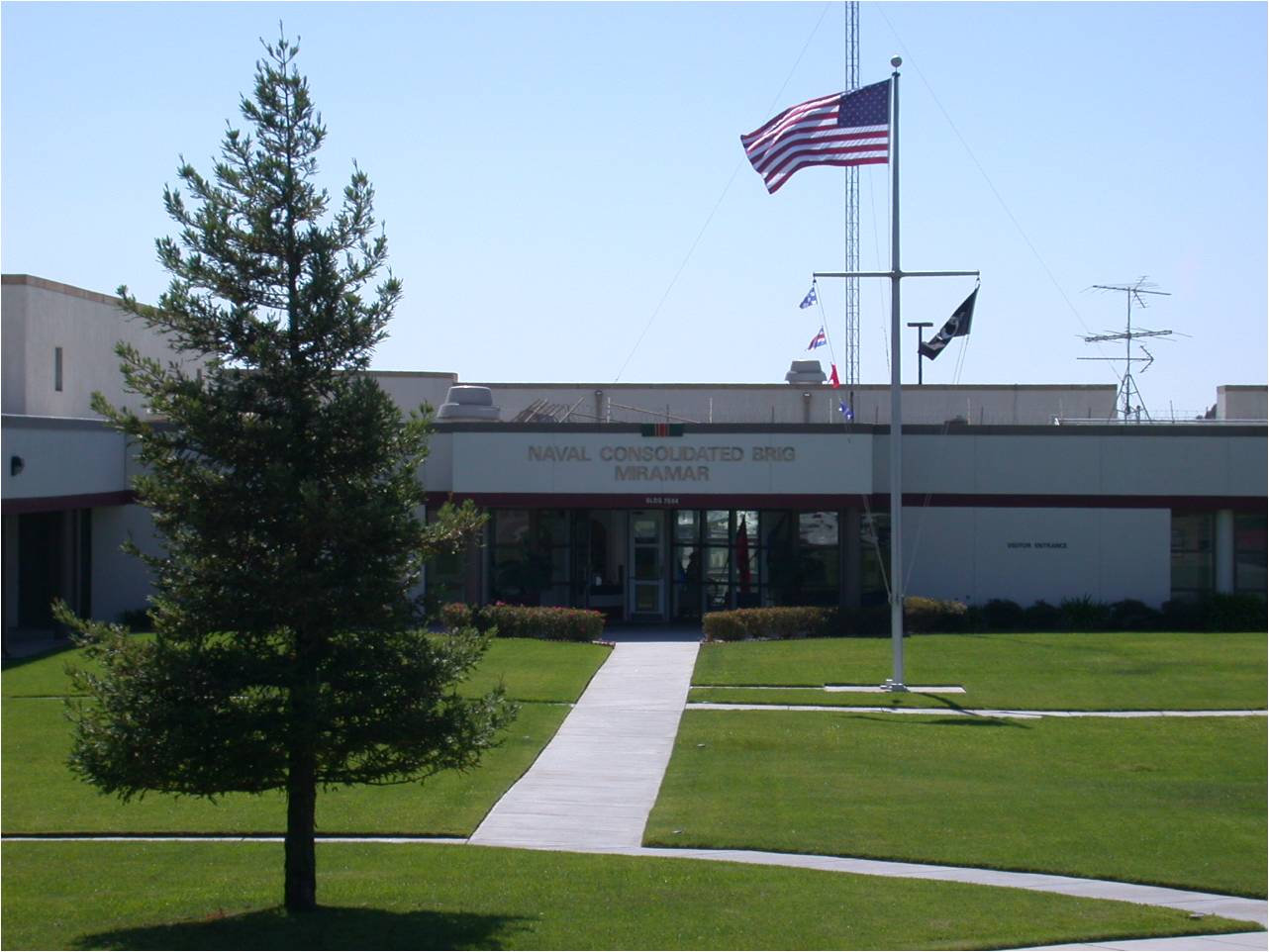
All female prisoners in the DOD serve time at Naval Consolidated Brig, Miramar (therefore female military service members under death sentence would await execution here).

Capital cases are tried in courts-martial before a panel of at least 12 military members. If the defendant is an enlisted service member, he or she may opt for at least one-third of the panel to also be of enlisted rank. All members of the panel must outrank the accused whenever logistically possible per 10 USC 825 (e)(1). The defendant cannot plead guilty to a capital offense if the government is seeking the death penalty. Unanimity is required for a conviction and is required separately to issue a death sentence during the penalty phase of the proceeding.

All death sentences are automatically appealed, first to the Court of Criminal Appeals for the military service concerned, then to the United States Court of Appeals for the Armed Forces. The sentence must be personally confirmed by the President of the United States.

Military executions would be conducted under regulations issued on October 30, 2023, and would ordinarily take place at the Special Housing Unit of the United States Disciplinary Barracks (USDB), Fort Leavenworth, Kansas or another location as designated by the Secretary of the Army. The death row inmates are confined at the USDB's Special Housing Unit and one at Camp Lejeune. All have been convicted of premeditated murder with aggravating factors.

Prior to 1991, the methods of execution approved by the Department of the Army were hanging, firing squad (musketry) or electrocution. Electrocution was added as an option in the 1950s, but could only be used at a specific confinement facility designated by Headquarters, and only be performed by a professional civilian executioner. An electric chair was installed at the old USDB but was never used; after the demolition of the old barracks, the decommissioned chair was moved to the Military Police Museum at Fort Leonard Wood, where it constitutes a permanent exhibition. The last military execution occurred in 1961 by hanging. In the post-Gregg era, the Department of Defense had planned to adopt the Federal Bureau of Prisons' civilian lethal injection procedures. Since 2019, military regulations allow the Secretary of the Army to specify a method of execution, after lethal injection was removed from the Army regulations.

== Extrajudicial executions and the War on Terrorism ==
Under the Military Commissions Act of 2009, military commissions may be established in the field in time of war to expeditiously try and sentence enemy military personnel under the UCMJ for certain offenses. Controversially, this Act permits military commissions to try and sentence "'alien unprivileged enemy belligerent[s]'" accused of having "'engaged in'" or "'purposefully and materially support[ed] hostilities'" against the United States or its allies, without the benefit of some UCMJ protections. In a military commission trial, the death penalty may be imposed, but only in case of a unanimous verdict and sentencing decision. The United States has sought to try several of the perpetrators of the 9/11 attacks, as well as other alleged terrorists, before military commissions. However, these prosecutions have been fraught with legal challenges and delay resulting from evidence obtained during so-called enhanced interrogations, and therefore, as of 2025, have not resulted in any convictions that have led to death sentences.

In the aftermath of the 9/11 attacks against the United States in 2001, Congress also passed an Authorization for Use of Military Force Resolution authorizing the President to: "use all necessary and appropriate force against those nations, organizations, or persons he determines planned, authorized, committed, or aided the terrorist attacks that occurred on September 11, 2001, or harbored such organizations or persons, in order to prevent any future acts of international terrorism against the United States by such nations, organizations or persons." The challenges associated with prosecutions by military commissions may have reinforced the American practice of relying on direct military action against terrorist leaders, including Osama bin Laden, rather than attempting their apprehension and prosecution. In 2025, President Donald Trump broadened this approach, conducting what United Nations legal experts determined to be extrajudicial executions of alleged drug traffickers.

== Historical usage ==
=== War of Independence ===
The application of military law by the Continental Army was governed under 69 Articles of War adopted by the Second Continental Congress on 30 June 1775. In the 18th century, capital punishment was a common and accepted punishment in European armies for a range of offenses and the American Articles of War were no exception to this practice. General George Washington was said to have "approved hundreds of death sentences by either hanging or firing squad". Mutiny could be dealt with in a harsh manner, as occurred at Pompton, New Jersey in January 1781, where three soldiers (one being reprieved at the last minute) were selected to be shot from among a large group of mutineers. The firing squad was ordered to be composed of their fellow mutineers. Nevertheless, reprieves were not uncommon and it was not out of the ordinary for such reprieves to arrive at the last minute. Summary executions on the battlefield were also specifically authorized. Four days after the American defeat at the Battle of Brandywine in September 1777, General Washington issued general orders which stated the following:

Brigadiers and Officers commanding regiments are also to post some good officers in the rear, to keep the men in order, and if in time of action, any man, who is not wounded, whether he has arms or not, turns his back upon the enemy and attempts to run away, or retreats before orders are given for it, those officers are to instantly to put him to death. The man does not deserve to live who basely flies, breaks his solemn engagements, and betrays his country.

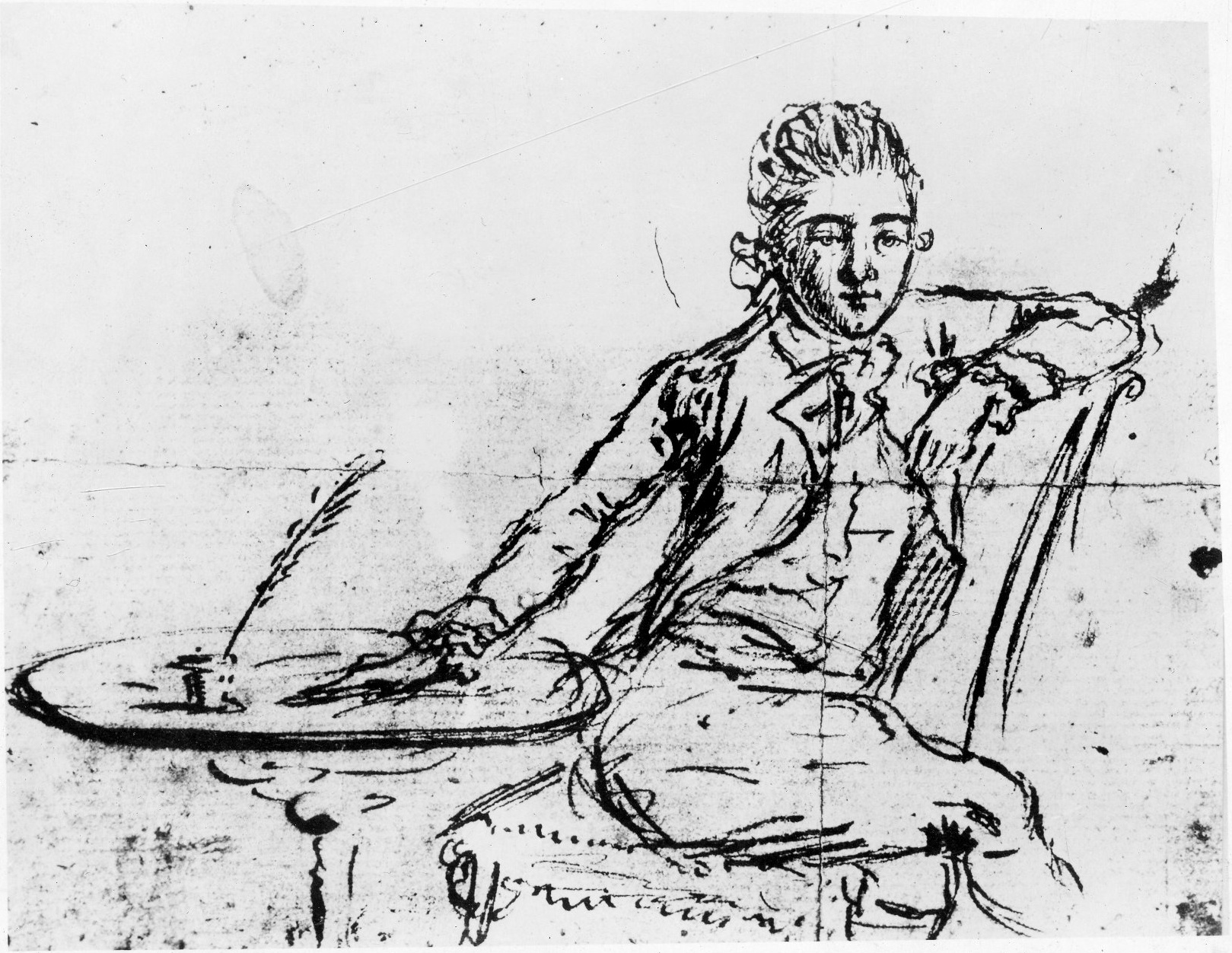
Self-portrait drawn by Major John André on the day before his execution by the Continental Army, October 1780

In keeping with norms accepted in most militaries of the day, the death penalty was also applied in cases of espionage against American forces; perhaps the most notable case being the execution of British Major John André in October 1780.

=== War of 1812/Creek War ===
Throughout the nineteenth century, and into the twentieth, military justice in the US Army, including the application of the death penalty, was governed under revised Articles of War adopted by Congress in 1806. Over the course of the War of 1812, the use of the death penalty in the US Army expanded. The American army performed poorly in the initial stages of the war, with General William Hull surrendering Detroit in 1812. Hull was sentenced to death for neglect of duty and bad conduct, though his sentence was remitted by President Madison. In 1812, a total of four sentences of execution were pronounced with three being reprieved. However, in 1813 there were 43 executions authorised and only 11 reprieves. By 1814, 160 death sentences were pronounced but only 14 reprieved (including General Hull). In 1815, as the war ended, 53 soldiers were sentenced to death while 29 were reprieved.

In the Creek campaign of 1814, Private John Woods of the 39th United States Infantry was executed by a firing squad for assaulting a superior officer. Andrew Jackson was troubled by serious discipline problems with his militia and volunteers, particularly the militia from East Tennessee, so he prosecuted Private John Woods, only 18 years old, under allegedly false charges. Private Woods had spent his last month in the camp of the 39th. The night before his execution, the officers of the 39th signed and sent Jackson a petition asking for mercy. He not only failed to grant it, but made the 39th shoot him. The 39th was never happy with Jackson after that. Colonel John Williams, the commanding officer of the 39th United States Infantry, said in a campaign pamphlet in 1828 that Private Woods cried "bitterly and loudly"; the Jackson camp claimed he was belligerent and deserved to die.

=== Mexican–American War ===
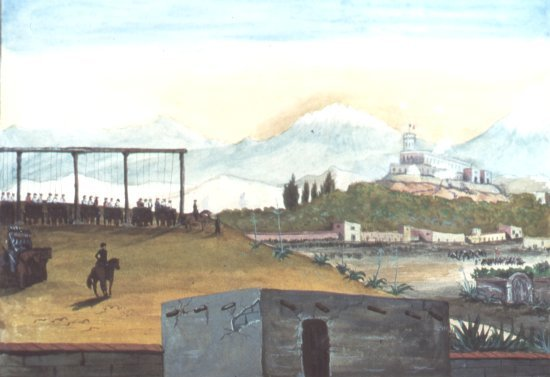
The hanging of San Patricios deserters at the Battle of Chapultepec, September 1847 (painting by Samuel Chamberlain)

The death penalty was enforced for varying crimes during the Mexican–American War from 1846 to 1848, including in cases of American soldiers or civilians committing crimes against the Mexican population. In 1847, Isaac Kirk, a black civilian working for the US Army, was hanged after being convicted by a military commission of rape and theft. However, the death penalty was most actively used for the offense of desertion, which was a significant problem for the US Army during the war. In the most infamous case, 50 former American soldiers who were serving with the Mexican Army's San Patricios Foreign Legion were executed for desertion. In what likely constitutes the second largest mass execution in American history, thirty of them were hanged at the Battle of Chapultepec in 1847 at the precise moment that the American flag replaced the Mexican flag atop the citadel.

=== American Civil War ===
The Union Army executed at least 267 soldiers for military offenses during the Civil War, including 147 for desertion. Other sources suggest that the number of executions by the Union during the Civil War were more than 275. Nevertheless, most death sentences were not carried out since at least 1,883 death sentences for varying crimes were pronounced but the vast majority were reprieved. This was especially true in cases of desertion and other purely military offenses, for which President Lincoln often granted pardons.

Executions were not limited to Union military personnel but were also carried out as punishment for various wartime offenses including for espionage and other crimes. According to the National Park Service, there were nearly 1,000 military tribunals in which "Confederates, both regulars and guerrillas, were charged with various violations of the laws of war – mostly related to the treatment of prisoners of war". One of the most famous offenses committed during the Civil War, and tried under American military law, was the trial of the assassins of President Lincoln in 1865. Other military tribunals formed during, and after, the Civil War included:

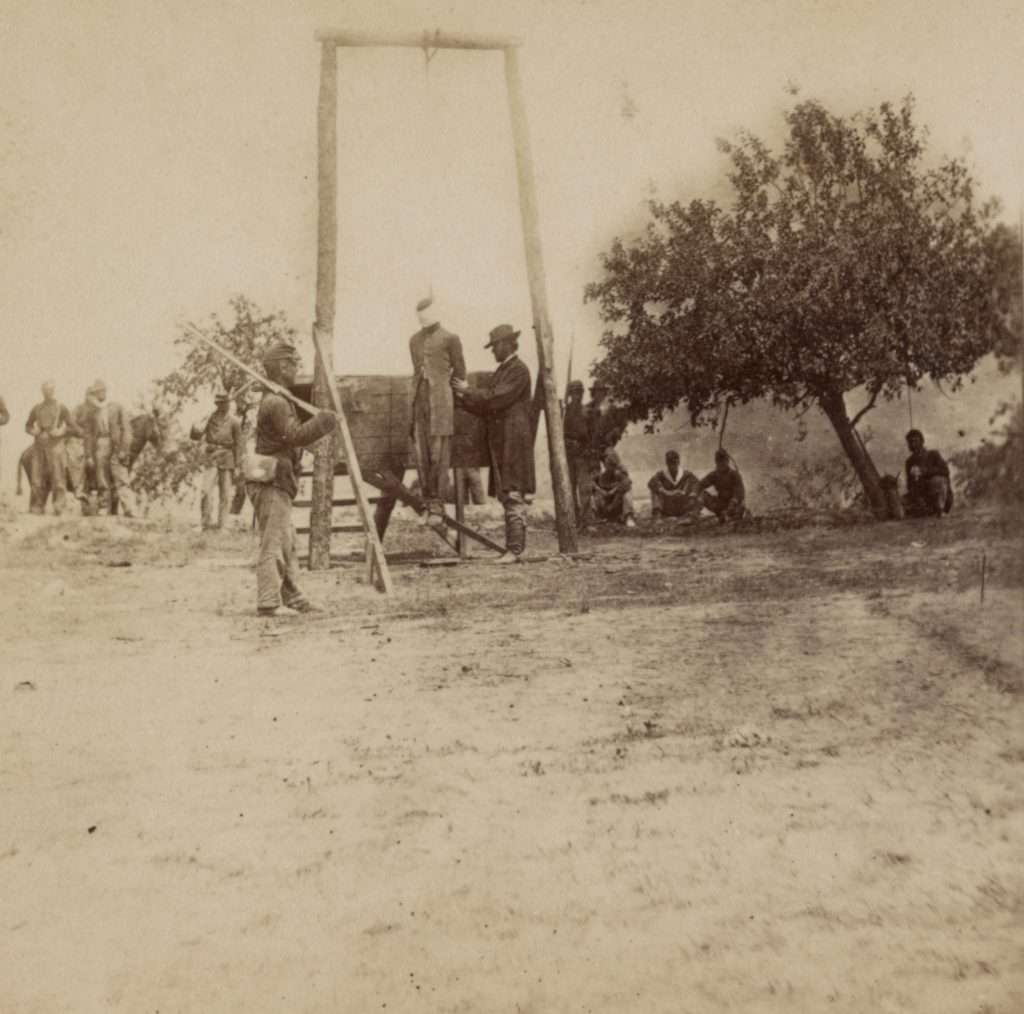
William Johnson's execution during the Siege of Petersburg, June 1864

Union General William Rosecrans approved the courts-martial and hanging of two Confederate officers, Lawrence Orton Williams and Walter Peters, on June 9, 1863, at Franklin, Tennessee, after the duo had disguised themselves as Union officers for the purposes of spying.

On June 21, 1864, William Johnson, a black soldier in the Union Army, was hanged at the Siege of Petersburg for the attempted rape of a woman whose husband was said to be away serving in the Confederate Army. A request was made to the Confederate forces for a ceasefire so that Johnson could be executed in view of Confederate lines. The request was granted. When Johnson was arrested, he had denied his guilt and given a false name. Shortly before his execution, however, he made a full confession.

When Johnson was arrested by some cavalry, just after his crime, he stoutly denied his guilt, and gave his name as Robert Henry Hughes, and said he belonged to the Quartermaster's Department, but after being sentenced, acknowledged his guilt, and gave his real name, confessing also that he enlisted in Baltimore on the 3d of March, in the 23d U.S. Infantry, that he was 23 years of age and had deserted. He also said his punishment was just, and hoped others would take warning by his fate. He appeared quite collected during the whole time, meeting his fate with great resignation, and died apparently very easy, although his neck was not broken by the fall. His pulse ceased to beat at the end of seven minutes. His body was left hanging until afternoon, and then was buried near the spot.

On March 15, 1865, Confederate captain Marcellus Jerome Clarke, sometimes better known under the alias Sue Mundy, was convicted by a Union military commission of the multiple murder of prisoners and hanged in Kentucky.

On March 25, 1865, Confederate captain Robert Cobb Kennedy was hanged in New York City for spying and for planting explosives around New York City, including at P. T. Barnum's Museum.

In July 1865, four people, who had been tried in a military court for the assassination of President Lincoln, were executed by hanging in Washington DC.

On September 6, 1865, two Union soldiers were hanged in Ohio for the murder of a military policeman.

On October 20, 1865, Confederate war criminal Champ Ferguson was hanged in Tennessee on multiple murder charges, including the murder of a Union officer in a Confederate hospital in November 1864. While he had been held for court martial by Confederate authorities he was released in the chaos of the late stage of the war. Tried by Union authorities after capture, he was sentenced to death by a military commission.

On October 29, 1865, Henry C. Magruder was hanged in Kentucky for guerrilla activities, including eight murders of Union soldiers and civilians.

On November 10, 1865, Henry Wirz, Confederate commander of Camp Anderson (aka Andersonville POW camp) was tried and convicted of "conspiracy to kill or injure prisoners in violation of the laws of war". He was executed by hanging.

=== Indian Wars ===
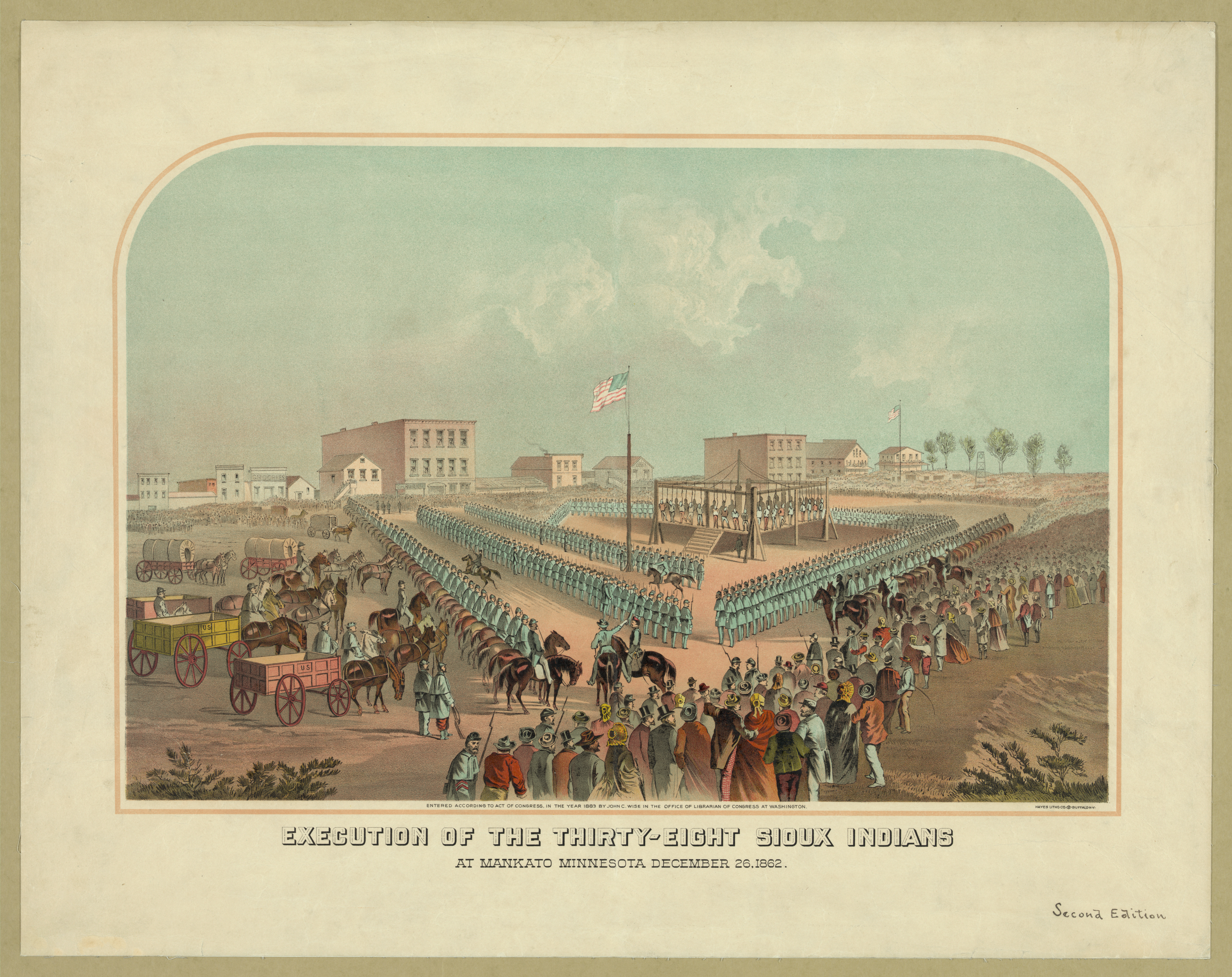
Execution of the thirty-eight Sioux Indians, at Mankato Minnesota, December, 26, 1862 (1883)

The US Army Center of Military History lists 14 separate Indian campaigns fought by the US Army between 1790 and 1891 for which campaign streamers were awarded. Nevertheless, dozens of separate campaigns were fought during the 19th century and a number involved US military courts enforcing US authority, including through the use of the death penalty applied to Indigenous combatants and populations. Tribunals were often hastily formed, trials were often short and defendants may have received no legal representation. During the Dakota War of 1862, hundreds of Sioux Indians were tried for offenses of murder and rape and more than 300 were sentenced to death. While President Lincoln ultimately commuted most of the sentences, 38 were hanged in the largest judcial mass execution in American history.

The death penalty was also applied during the Modoc War of 1872–73. In the aftermath of that conflict, four Modoc warriors, including Modoc Chief Kintpuash (also known as "Captain Jack"), were executed after being convicted by a military tribunal of the murder of Major General Edward Canby during peace negotiations. The death sentences of two others were commuted by President Grant.

=== Philippine–American War ===
During the Philippine–American War, the counterinsurgency campaign conducted by the American military involved considerable brutality on both sides, including summary executions of both combatants and civilians. In the course of the conflict, 17 American soldiers were sentenced to death for desertion. However, only two sentences, applied to black soldiers (Edmund DuBose and Lewis Russell) of the 9th Cavalry Regiment, who had been convicted of far more serious charges of desertion to the enemy in 1902, were carried out; an action which critics have asserted amounted to a selective and unfair application of the death penalty. These were the last American soldiers to be executed for desertion until the execution of Private Eddie Slovik during the Second World War.

=== First World War ===
The United States Army executed 36 soldiers during the First World War by hanging between November 5, 1917, and June 20, 1919, all for rape and/or murder. Of those executed, three were white, 32 were black, and one was Native American. Eleven of these executions were carried out in France while the remaining 25 were carried out in the continental United States.

Overall, 62 American soldiers were sentenced to death while serving in France. General John J. Pershing commuted 22 of the death sentences to prison terms and a further 29 soldiers received clemency by President Woodrow Wilson. Twenty-four American soldiers were sentenced to death for desertion, but all received clemency by President Wilson.

Of the 25 soldiers executed in the continental United States, all but one of them were black. Nineteen black soldiers were executed in Texas for roles in the Houston riot of 1917. In 2023, all 19 black soldiers who were executed for their roles in the Houston riot of 1917, along with 91 other black soldiers who were convicted, but not executed, had their convictions set aside by the military on the grounds that their trials had been unfair and were held in a racist atmosphere.

Two black soldiers, Privates John B. Mann and Walter Matthews, were executed at Camp Logan in Texas on April 5, 1918, for the murder of Private Ralph M. Foley, a white fellow soldier whom they'd stabbed to death. Another three black soldiers, Stanley Grammell, Robert Johnson, and Fred Allen, were executed at Camp Dodge in Iowa on July 5, 1918, for gang-raping a 17-year-old white girl after beating her boyfriend unconscious on May 24, 1918. On July 11, 1918, Nat Hoffman, was executed at Camp MacArthur in Texas for raping an 11-year-old schoolgirl in mid April 1918. He was the only white soldier to be executed in the continental United States during World War I. Hoffman had attacked a boy who was about the same age as the girl, then attacked the girl after the boy escaped.

Of the 11 American soldiers executed in France, one was Native American, eight were black, two were white. The first to be executed was Frank Cadue, a Native American soldier who was hanged on November 5, 1917, for the rape and murder of Raymonde Georgette Sirjean, a 7-year-old French girl on October 20, 1917. Cadue made no effort to deny his guilt, only claiming that he had been drunk and did not remember committing the crime. The last three soldiers to be executed were Henry Williams, Sercy Strong, and Charles Witham, who were hanged on June 20, 1919. Williams and Strong had been convicted of murdering a French man and raping his daughter. Witham had been convicted of murdering a fellow soldier on January 21, 1919. He had been arrested for a minor charge and was being escorted to a court-martial by another soldier when he stole the revolver of a military police officer who was guarding him and shot him four times. He then hacked the victim's body with a hatchet.

=== Interwar period ===
On March 18, 1926, US Army Lieutenant John Sewell Thompson, 25, was executed by hanging at Fort McKinley for murdering his fiancée, 16-year-old Audrey Burleigh. He was the first American officer executed in peacetime, and to date, he is the only graduate of the United States Military Academy to have been executed.

The United States Coast Guard executed Prohibition-era rum-runner James Alderman, who had been convicted of three counts of murder on the high seas, in 1929. The execution, the only one to be carried out by the Coast Guard as of 2026, was carried out under terms of the Coast Guard Act of 1915.

=== Second World War and up to 1961 ===
US military justice during World War II was governed under the Articles of War enacted on June 4, 1920. These Articles were in effect through World War II and up until the Uniform Code of Military Justice came into effect in 1951. The US military is known to have executed 160 American servicemen between 1942 and 1961. Of these executions, 157 were carried out by the US Army (including members of the United States Army Air Forces prior to September 1947). After becoming independent of the US Army on September 18, 1947, the United States Air Force conducted the three remaining executions, one in 1950 and two in 1954. Most of these 160 executions (a total of 141) took place between 1942 and February 1946 (during and immediately after World War II). The United States Navy has not executed any of its own sailors since 1849 (when sailors John and Peter Black were hanged at the yardarm for a mutiny committed on the USS Ewing).

Although racial disparities in military executions were lower than they were in World War I, they were still substantial. Of the 141 soldiers executed by the US military between 1942 and February 1946, 23 were white, 110 were black, six were Hispanic, and two were Native American. Twenty-five out of the 29 US soldiers executed for rape in France were black. At the same time, over 20 of the black soldiers executed for murder had been convicted of murdering other black soldiers. Racial bias was not the only factor in the disparities, either. Most white soldiers were in mobile units, making them harder to track down, whereas most black soldiers were in stationary units.

Of the 160 known executions, 21 were executed for both rape and murder, 85 for murder, 53 for rape, and one (Private Eddie Slovik) for desertion. While more than 21,000 soldiers were convicted of desertion during World War II, only 49 were sentenced to death and one was executed.

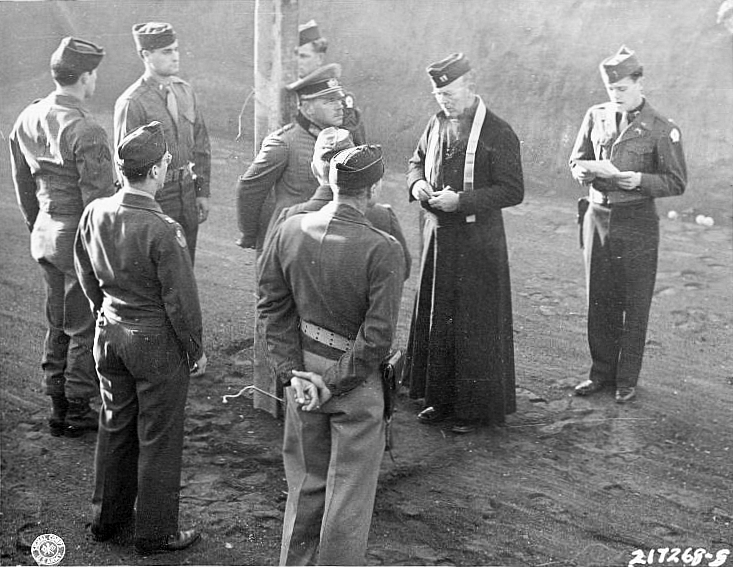
Execution of Lieutenant General Anton Dostler by US Army firing squad for the murder of captured US soldiers (December 1, 1945)

These figures for total known executions do not include those executed by the US Army or Navy after being convicted by US military courts for violations of the laws of war, including about 18 German soldiers who were shot after being caught in American uniform as part of Operation Greif during the Battle of the Bulge, people caught engaging in acts of espionage against US forces, or soldiers or civilians convicted by US military courts of having committed crimes against American military personnel, including as occurred at Rüsselsheim, Germany in 1944 and elsewhere. The United States Navy hanged 14 Japanese soldiers/sailors for war crimes committed on Guam, Wake Island or elsewhere in the Pacific theater during World War II.

Evidence also suggests that other persons, both American military personnel or enemy combatants/civilians, may have been executed during the Second World War or during the occupation of Germany/Japan pursuant to verdicts by American military tribunals or decisions taken by senior commanders. At the liberation of Dachau concentration camp in April 1945 it is estimated that around 60 SS camp guards were summarily executed by American troops, an action senior American generals refused to prosecute.

In 1945, the US Army executed fourteen German prisoners of war (POWs) by hanging at the United States Disciplinary Barracks at Fort Leavenworth. The POWs, members of the German armed services, had been convicted by general court-martial for the murders of fellow Germans believed by their fellow inmates to be collaborating as confidential informants with the United States military authorities. While the murders had been committed in 1943 and 1944, the executions were delayed until after the end of hostilities in Europe due to fears of German retaliation against Allied POWs.

== See also ==
- List of people executed by the United States military
- List of death row inmates in the United States § Military
