= John E. Day =

American soldier and convicted war criminal (1929–1959)

John E. Day Jr.
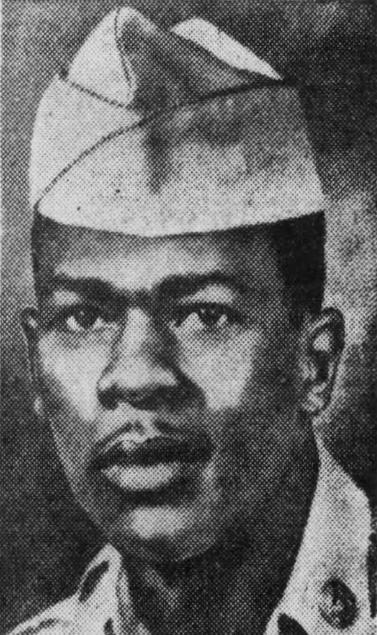
- Born: 1929; Washington, D.C., U.S.
- Died: September 23, 1959 (aged 30); United States Disciplinary Barracks, Fort Leavenworth, Kansas, U.S.
- Status: Executed by hanging
- Motive: Rape
- Convictions: Premeditated murder Assault with a dangerous weapon with intent to do bodily harm
- Penalty: Death (October 1, 1951)

Details
- Victims: Lee Hak Chun; Lee In Ja
- Date: December 23, 1950
- Country: South Korea
- Location: Seoul
- Weapon: M1 carbine
- Military career
- Allegiance: United States
- Branch: United States Army
- Rank: Private (E-2)
- Unit: 46th Transportation Truck Company
- Conflicts: Korean War

John E. Day Jr. (1929 – September 23, 1959) was a U.S. Army soldier during the Korean War, as well as a murderer, rapist, and convicted war criminal. In December 1950, shortly before the start of the Third Battle of Seoul, Day, who was serving in Seoul as a truck driver, attacked a family of South Korean refugees. He raped the mother, shot and killed her husband, and threw the couple's baby, who later died, on the front seat of a truck. Day was court-martialed for the crime, sentenced to death, and executed by hanging in 1959.

After examining the case, J. William Barba, assistant special counsel in the White House, stated that while Day's crimes were "committed under stress of war conditions," his sentence was appropriate. Barba noted that Day was black, but so were two members of the military court at his court-martial. The United States Armed Forces had been desegregated via an executive order by Harry S. Truman in 1948, and under U.S. military law, the decision to sentence a defendant to death had to be made unanimously.

Day was the only U.S. soldier to be executed for war crimes committed during the Korean War, and remains the last American to be executed for war crimes by his own country. He is currently the penultimate person to be executed by the U.S. military.

== Early life ==
Day was born in Washington, D.C., to Martha Day, and was raised along with four brothers and two sisters. His father abandoned the family when he was young. Day graduated from Phelps Vocational High School. After several minor arrests for drunkenness, he enlisted in the U.S. Army in 1949. Day was deployed to South Korea after the start of the Korean War and assigned to the 46th Transportation Truck Company.

== Crime ==
On the night of December 22–23, 1950, Lee Hak Chun, his wife, Kim Chung Hi, and their three children were in a basement room of the "VIP billets" in the Eighth Army Officers' Building in Seoul awaiting transportation to Daegu since Chinese troops were advancing on the city. Several other Koreans were waiting in an adjoining room. Around midnight, a drunken Day entered the room where Lee and his family were waiting, sat beside Kim, and briefly turned off the lights. Day then turned on the lights and grabbed Kim by the throat. When a third person intervened and took Kim from Day, he struck Lee in the mouth. Day left the room, but soon returned with an interpreter. Armed with a carbine, Day had the interpreter say that he wanted Kim "conceded" to him. He said if Lee did not send his wife upstairs, he would kill them all. Day had everyone in the room line up, then had Lee step out of line, after which he shot him twice in the chest.

Day then grabbed Kim and took her outside, where he continued to make sexual advances toward her. When she screamed, Day struck her head with his carbine five times, took her baby daughter, Lee In Ja, from her back, and threw the baby on the front seat of a truck. He then proceeded to rape Kim, after which he returned to his quarters and went to sleep. Shortly after, another soldier arrived, having heard Kim's screams. About an hour later, a CID officer arrived at the office, where he found Lee lying dead on the floor.

== Court-martial and civil suit ==
Day was immediately apprehended and confessed to killing Lee:

I came downstairs to look for the house boys. I went down to the basement. While I was down there I saw this woman and I started to talk to her. After I started to talk to her this man jumped up and tried to keep me from talking to her. He started talking loud but I couldn't understand that he was trying to get me to leave the woman alone. The woman wasn't putting up a squaak [sic] and then he was pulling on me so I shot him. After I shot him he fell and the broad ran up the outside stairs and I went up behind her. I caught her out by the trucks. She was scared and I took the baby off her and took the baby back inside. I don't remember what I did with the baby. After that I went up and went to bed.

Due to the military situation in Seoul, however, he was not charged until May 13, 1951. Due to the difficulty of locating witnesses, the investigation was not completed until August 1951. Day was initially charged with the murders of both Lee and his baby daughter, but the latter charge was soon dropped. The case against Day was referred for trial on September 22, 1951, after which he was taken into custody and flown to Japan. His court-martial was held in Tokyo on October 1, 1951. Kim testified at Day's court-martial, and lost her composure as she described how Day had grabbed her baby. Numerous other witnesses to the crime also testified, including Duck Il Wang.

The colored American soldier pointed his carbine at me and ordered me to go with him to the basement. The soldier told me he would kill everyone in the room if the woman did not give into him.

Day claimed that he had shot Lee in self-defense. When the death of Kim's baby was mentioned, his lawyer claimed that he did not treat the child "in a rough manner", but merely placed her in the front seat of the truck.

Day was found guilty and sentenced to death, with the court stating that he "be put to death in such manner as proper authority may direct," either by hanging or firing squad. He was the first U.S. soldier to be condemned by an Army court-martial since World War II. Afterwards, Kim Chung Hi filed a claim against the United States, seeking 1,338,672 South Korean hwan in compensation for the murders of her husband and daughter. In 1956, Congress authorized and directed the Secretary of the Treasury to appropriate $2,788.90 ($32,789.98 in 2025), to Kim Chung Hi, plus any additional sums for the increases in rates of exchange as necessary to fulfill her claim.

== Appeals ==
Day's conviction and sentence were upheld by the Army Board of Review. On October 16, 1953, they were approved by United States Secretary of the Army Robert T. Stevens, who recommended that his death sentence be carried out. Day's case was last reviewed by the United States Court of Military Appeals, which described his crime as "horrifying" and also declined to intervene. On June 30, 1954, President Dwight D. Eisenhower signed off on Day's execution and directed that it be carried out under the orders of the Secretary of the Army. Day's execution was scheduled for August 1954, but a stay of execution was granted on August 16 by Justice Walter M. Bastian so that Day's attorney, Harry C. Wood, could file for a writ of habeas corpus. Wood claimed that Day's rights had been violated when a statement that he had given while he was still drunk was admitted by the court. The petition was dismissed on the grounds of lack of jurisdiction on September 9, 1954, albeit Wood filed another appeal to the U.S. District Court for the District of Columbia on October 8, 1954, which was not heard until March 1957.

Initially, Day was supposed to be flown from a U.S. military stockade to South Korea for his execution. However, in 1955, he was returned to the United States. This came after U.S. military authorities decided to start carrying out all future executions at the United States Disciplinary Barracks in Fort Leavenworth, Kansas. After being transferred to the United States, Wood filed another petition for a writ of habeas corpus, this time in the U.S. District Court for the District of Kansas. The appeal was dismissed in November 1955, as was a second appeal to a federal appellate court in Denver. In October 1956, another two appeals by Day were rejected. The U.S. Court of Appeals for the Tenth Circuit affirmed the order the rejection of his Kansas appeal, and the Supreme Court rejected a separate appeal in October 1956. In April 1957, Day's 1954 appeal was granted, with the court ruling that the U.S. District Court for the District of Columbia shouldn't have dismissed Day's writ of habeas corpus. However, in May 1958, the U.S. Court of Appeals for the District of Columbia Circuit overruled the decision, stating that the District Court had been correct to dismiss the writ. A petition for a rehearing en banc was denied on May 5, 1958.

== Clemency petitions ==
In August 1954, Kim Chung-hee, having learned about Day's scheduled execution, wrote to President Eisenhower, asking him to spare his life:

Pvt. Day was young when he committed the offense. He did know what harm he was doing. He has been in jail for three years and has had time to repent this offense. I am sure that he is sorry. I do not wish to see Pvt. Day's mother hurt, as I was hurt three years ago, by the death of her son. As you surely know, those were difficult times in December 1950. What may have seemed just for those times seems far too severe now that we have peace again. I would be sorry to see another death when I know that it will bring only unhappiness. It will not help me or anyone else.

After examining the case, J. William Barba, assistant special counsel in the White House, stated that Day's crimes were "committed under stress of war conditions." He mentioned a letter from South Korean President Syngman Rhee, urging clemency in gratitude for the U.S. soldiers "who came and fought with our men in defense of freedom." However, Barba ultimately concluded that the death sentence was appropriate. He noted that while Day was black, so were two members of the military court that condemned him to death. He stated that although Day's trial could've been more thorough, it was fair, and that "nothing in the record is sufficiently extraordinary to warrant clemency in view of the atrociousness of the crime." On June 9, 1958, Day's mother, Martha Day wrote a letter to Eisenhower requesting clemency, believing her son had been unfairly tried:

He has been under this sentence for a long time.

On January 16, 1959, Wood wrote a letter requesting clemency to Eisenhower, in which he stated, "Life is sometimes cheap. But even the momentary emerge of a human being into a new and better world is priceless." On March 15, 1959, having exhausted nearly all avenues to escape execution, Day wrote to the new U.S. Secretary of the Army, Wilber M. Brucker, pleading for mercy:

I realized now that the chance for a decent, constructive life begins inside of a person. That is one truth to become ingraved [sic] in my heart... Before now, sir, I have had very little self-pride or respect for others because I felt a stranger in a world I could never understand... And though it had been far from easy to carry this sentence, this pales in the realization of what I have done. A lasting sorrow has come to me over the years.

Eisenhower re-approved Day's death sentence on July 10, and his execution was scheduled for September 23. Wood wrote another letter to Eisenhower on July 14.

For nearly eight years, he has lived with an interminable an unimaginable burden. Day is a product of the society out of which he grew. Required by circumstances to grow to young manhood in what he now recognizes as a jungle world, he was then given a gun and sent to Korea. He now faces death without fear but with sorrow and repentance for what he has done. No one could pay a greater price, even with his life.

On July 17, 1959, Homer Davis, a lawyer representing military death row inmates, also appealed to Eisenhower for mercy:

How many deaths has Day died in these last eight years only he can tell. He comes from a very sordid background of poverty, city slums, and a drunken father who deserted his family at an early age. Surely, society is responsible to some matter in this degree.

Joseph Thompson, a social worker who interacted with Day in prison, said Day had struggled to accept his upcoming execution, not out of fear of dying, but due to how long he had been on death row. Day had been on the U.S. military's death row longer than anyone else.

All this time he kept saying, "I wonder why now?" He wondered why now they were doing this to him because he wasn't the same man that eight or nine years ago was firing an AR rifle.

On July 20, 1959, Day wrote personally to Eisenhower, recalling the war:

I often thought of running away and becoming purposely lost in the confusion of battle. My wordless cries of remorse have kept me awake overnight for many of the two thousand and seven hundred days and nights I have waited under this sentence.

In August, You Chan Yang, South Korean ambassador to the United States, reiterated President Rhee's plea for mercy "in this young man's behalf." On the morning of September 22, 1959, Day sent one last telegram to Eisenhower, asking him to reconsider his decision, mentioning his army ID dog tag.

Informed of your decision. Humbly ask reconsider with attention to previous letters. Attention respectively drawn to Reader's Digest page 180, plus new facts in case. Sincerely Pvt John E Day RA13233886.

== Execution ==
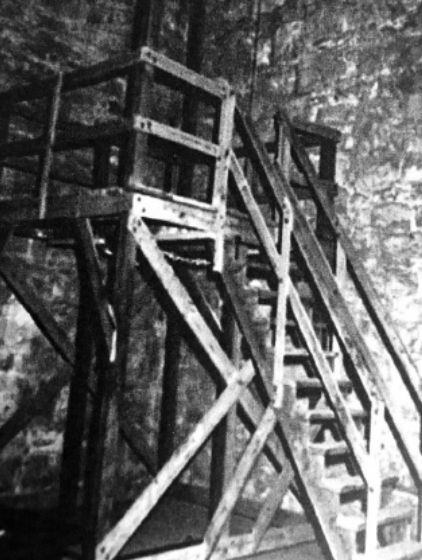
The gallows at the old U.S. Disciplinary Barracks

In the afternoon of September 22, 1959, Day had a last visit with his mother. Just before midnight, Commandant Colonel Weldon W. Cox arrived at Day's cell, and he was led out to the gallows. He wore his U.S. Army uniform stripped of its insignia. After Day mounted the scaffold, Cox read the court order that his death sentence be carried out and concluded, "May the Lord have mercy on your soul." Asked if he had any last words, Day said, "Thank you all for your consideration." He was hanged at 12:02 AM, and pronounced dead 15 minutes later. Day was buried in the Fort Leavenworth Military Prison Cemetery.

== See also ==
- Capital punishment by the United States military
- List of people executed by the United States military
- List of people executed in the United States in 1959
- War crimes in the Korean War
