= Fort Leavenworth Military Prison Cemetery =

American prison cemetery

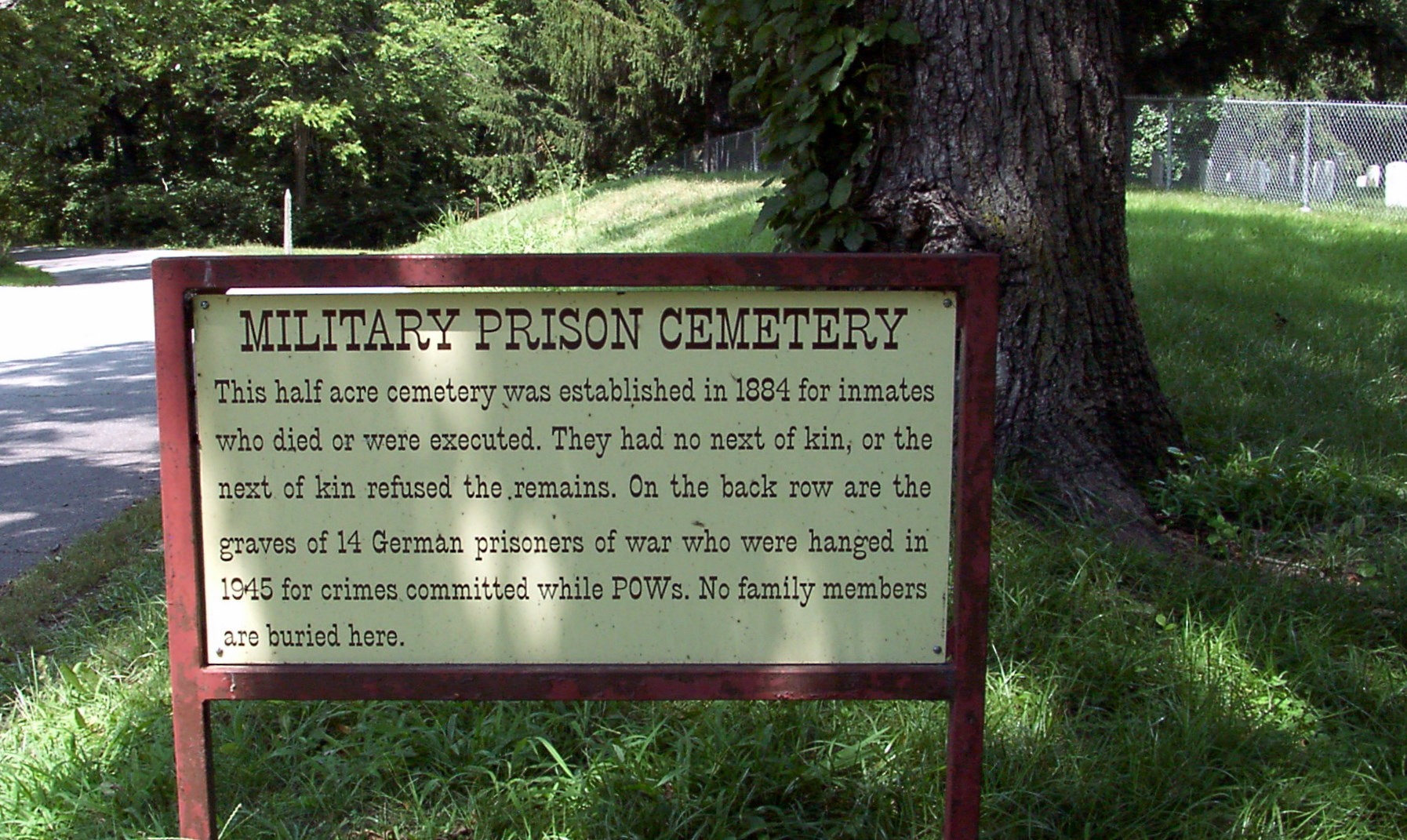
- U.S.D.B. Cemetery Sign
- Interactive map of Fort Leavenworth Military Prison Cemetery

Details
- Established: 1884
- Location: Fort Leavenworth, Kansas, US
- Country: United States
- Coordinates: 39°22′13″N 94°55′24″W
- Owned by: United States Disciplinary Barracks
- No. of graves: 299 (240 marked, 59 unmarked)
- Find a Grave: Fort Leavenworth Military Prison Cemetery

Fort Leavenworth Military Prison Cemetery (also known as the United States Disciplinary Barracks Cemetery) is a cemetery maintained by the Fort Leavenworth Military Prison, Leavenworth County, Kansas. The purpose of this cemetery is for the burial of unclaimed bodies of soldiers who died in the United States Disciplinary Barracks. It is the final resting place for 299 soldiers who died in the prison, 58 of whom lie in unmarked graves. The majority of the soldiers who are buried in Fort Leavenworth Military Prison Cemetery died between 1898 and 1905.

The last known interment in the cemetery occurred under special circumstances in May 2023, when the remains of U.S. Navy Lt. Andrew Chabrol, who had been executed by Virginia in 1993 for the 1991 abduction, rape and murder of a female enlisted sailor, were relocated from a niche at the columbarium of Arlington National Cemetery in accordance with a provision in the 2023 National Defense Authorization Act.

Otherwise, as families of soldiers who die while in custody of the U.S. Disciplinary Barracks are expected to claim the bodies, the U.S. military does not have any plan for future burials.

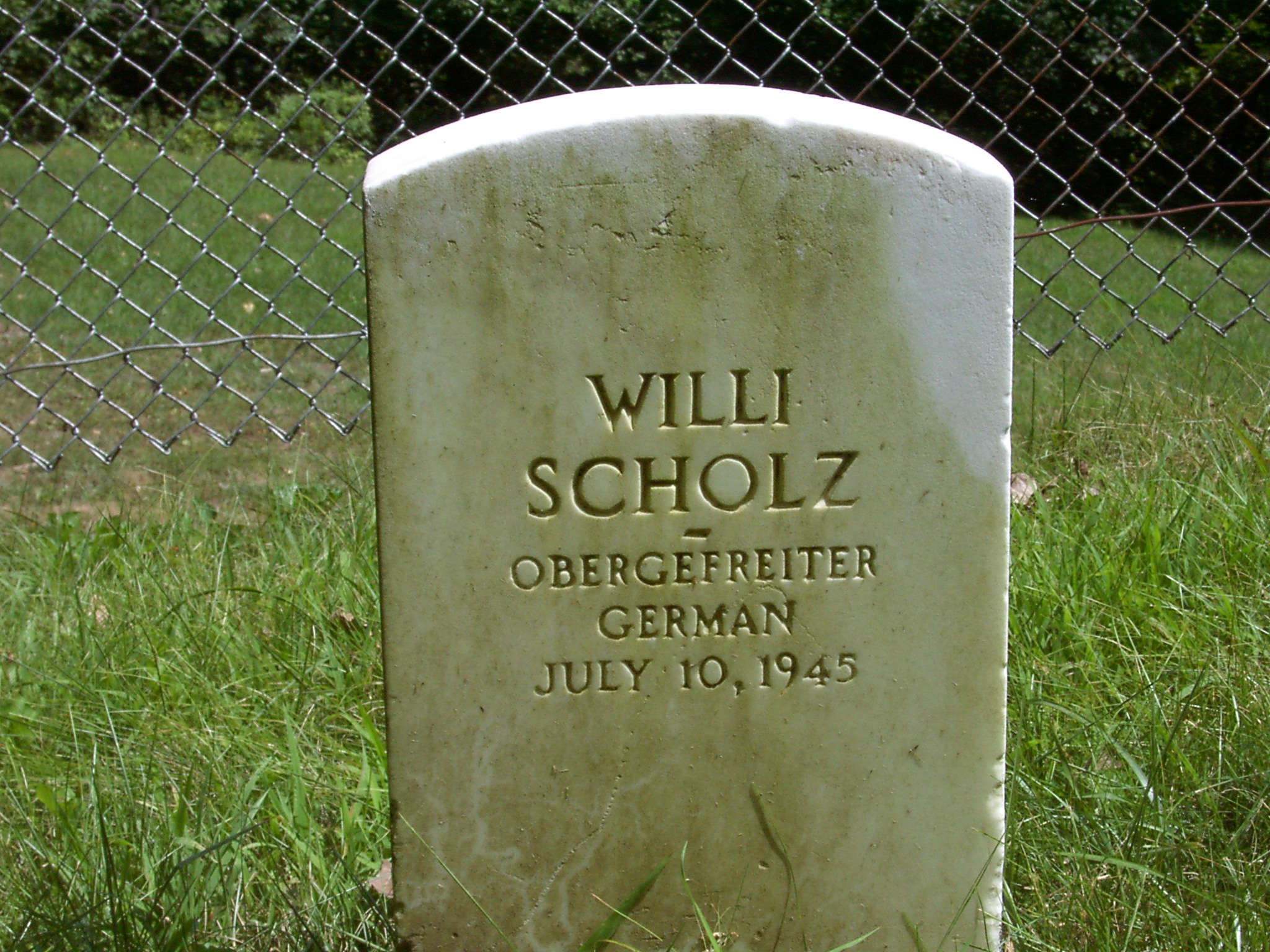
A headstone in the back row (11th) of a German POW buried at the site. This prisoner was hanged for the murder of Johannes Kunze.

Fourteen German prisoners of war who were executed in 1945 (for the murders of fellow-POWs Johannes Kunze, Horst Günther and Werner Drechsler) in the military prison are buried in the northwest corner of the cemetery.

== See also ==
- List of people executed by the United States military
