= List of people executed by the United States military =

The following is a list of people known to have been executed by the United States military since 1917. For a broader discussion, including earlier application of the death penalty under military law, see: Capital punishment by the United States military.

This list separates executions by branches; the Uniform Code of Military Justice did not exist until 1950.

== Executions after the enactment of Uniform Code of Military Justice ==
A total of ten military executions have been carried out by the United States Army under the provisions of the original Uniform Code of Military Justice of May 5, 1950. Executions must be approved by the president of the United States. Only a general courts martial may award a sentence of death. As such, they are therefore subject to an automatic process of review.

The first four of these executions, those of Bernard John O'Brien, Chastine Beverly, Louis M. Suttles, and James L. Riggins, were carried out by military officials at the Kansas State Penitentiary near Lansing, Kansas. The remaining six executions took place in the boiler room of the United States Disciplinary Barracks, Fort Leavenworth, Kansas. Currently, military executions can take place at any location chosen by the Secretary of the Army.

Hanging was the method employed in these ten executions. Electrocution was also made an authorized method, but was never used. Current regulations allow the Secretary of the Army to specify a method of execution.

No.	Name	Race	Age	Sex	Date of execution	Location of crime	Method	Crime	Victim(s)	President
1	Bernard John O'Brien	White	34	M	July 31, 1954	Bad Aibling, Bavaria, West Germany	Hanging	Premeditated murder	Dorothy Lucia O'Brien, 35, white (wife)	Dwight D. Eisenhower
2	Chastine Beverly	Black	25	M	March 1, 1955	Fort Leonard Wood, Missouri	Hanging	Premeditated murder	Harry Amos Langley, 52, white	Dwight D. Eisenhower
3	Louis M. Suttles	Black	26	M	March 1, 1955	Fort Leonard Wood, Missouri	Hanging	Premeditated murder	Harry Amos Langley, 52, white	Dwight D. Eisenhower
4	James L. Riggins	Black	28	M	March 1, 1955	Fort Leonard Wood, Missouri	Hanging	Premeditated murder	Harry Amos Langley, 52, white	Dwight D. Eisenhower
5	Thomas J. Edwards	Black	23	M	February 14, 1957	Kitzingen, Bavaria, West Germany	Hanging	Premeditated murder	Maria Stowasser, white	Dwight D. Eisenhower
6	Winfred D. Moore	Black	23	M	February 14, 1957	Fort Bragg, North Carolina	Hanging	Premeditated murder	Charles Pettit, 26, white	Dwight D. Eisenhower
7	Ernest L. Ransom	Black	26	M	April 3, 1957	Incheon, SCA, Korea	Hanging	Premeditated murder and rape	Chae Seung Man and a unnamed female, 14, Korean	Dwight D. Eisenhower
8	Abraham Thomas	Black	29	M	July 23, 1958	Gersthofen, Bavaria, West Germany	Hanging	Premeditated murder (4 specifications)	4 victims (Note: The victims were Walburga Wenderoth and Anna Wiegel, white, and Corporal Edward Peters (31, black) and Sergeant Lafayette Bennett (28, black).)	Dwight D. Eisenhower
9	John E. Day Jr.	Black	30	M	September 23, 1959	Seoul, SCA, Korea	Hanging	Premeditated murder	Lee Mak Chun, Korean (Note: Day also raped the victim's wife and murdered their infant daughter, but was not tried for these crimes.)	Dwight D. Eisenhower
10	John Arthur Bennett	Black	25	M	April 13, 1961	Siezenheim, Salzburg, Austria	Hanging	Rape (Note: Also convicted of the attempted murder of the victim.)	Gertrude, 11, white	John F. Kennedy

=== Demographics ===
Race
Black	9	90%
White	1	10%
Age
20–29	8	80%
30–39	2	20%
Sex
Male	10	100%
Date of execution
1950–1959	9	90%
1960–1969	1	10%
1970–1979	0	0%
1980–1989	0	0%
1990–1999	0	0%
2000–2009	0	0%
2010–2019	0	0%
2020–2029	0	0%
Method
Hanging	10	100%
President (Party)
Harry S. Truman (D)	0	0%
Dwight D. Eisenhower (R)	9	90%
John F. Kennedy (D)	1	10%
Lyndon B. Johnson (D)	0	0%
Richard Nixon (R)	0	0%
Gerald Ford (R)	0	0%
Jimmy Carter (D)	0	0%
Ronald Reagan (R)	0	0%
George H. W. Bush (R)	0	0%
Bill Clinton (D)	0	0%
George W. Bush (R)	0	0%
Barack Obama (D)	0	0%
Donald Trump (R)	0	0%
Joe Biden (D)	0	0%
Total	10	100%

=== People currently awaiting execution under the UCMJ ===
Four people are currently awaiting execution under the UCMJ. All executions, if carried out, will be by a method specified by the Secretary of the Army.

Name	Date of sentencing	Crime
Ronald Adrin Gray	April 12, 1988	Two specifications of premeditated murder, one specification of attempted premeditated murder, and three specifications of rape
Hasan Karim Akbar	April 28, 2005	Two specifications of premeditated murder and three specifications of attempted premeditated murder
Timothy Baily Hennis	April 15, 2010	Three specifications of premeditated murder
Nidal Malik Hasan	August 28, 2013	Thirteen specifications of premeditated murder and thirty-two specifications of attempted premeditated murder. Scheduled to be executed by firing squad on December 3, 2026.

== Executions by the Army ==
=== During World War I and up to 1919 ===
The United States Army executed 36 soldiers, all of them by hanging, between November 5, 1917, and June 20, 1919, all for rape and/or murder. Of those executed, three were white, 32 were black, and one was Native American. Eleven of these executions were carried out in France while the remaining 25 were carried out in the continental United States.

Nineteen black soldiers were executed in Texas for roles in the Houston riot of 1917. In 2023, all 19 black soldiers who were executed for their roles in the Houston riot of 1917, along with 91 other black soldiers who were convicted, but not executed, had their convictions set aside by the military on the grounds that their trials had been unfair and were held in a racist atmosphere.

Name	Race	Age	Date of execution	Location	Crime	Victim(s)	President
Frank Cadue	Native American	26	November 5, 1917	Givrauval, France, European Theater	Premeditated murder and rape	Raymonde Georgette Sirjean, 7, white	Woodrow Wilson
Charles W. Baltimore	Black	23	December 11, 1917	Salado Creek, Texas	Premeditated murder, mutiny, and willfully disobeying a superior commissioned officer (Note: All defendants convicted in the Houston riot of 1917 had their convictions posthumously vacated in 2023 on the grounds that they had not received fair trials.)	14 people, white (Note: E. A. Thompson, A.R. Carstens, M. Gerado, Fred J. Winkler, C.W. Wright, Earl Findley, R.H. Daniels, Horace Moodey, Joseph W. Mattes, Melvin D. Everton, E. S. Meineke, Ira D. Rainey, S. Satton, and Eli Smith.)	Woodrow Wilson
William Breckenridge	Black		December 11, 1917	Salado Creek, Texas	Premeditated murder, mutiny, and willfully disobeying a superior commissioned officer	14 people, white	Woodrow Wilson
Ira B. Davis	Black	28	December 11, 1917	Salado Creek, Texas	Premeditated murder, mutiny, and willfully disobeying a superior commissioned officer	14 people, white	Woodrow Wilson
James Divins	Black	24	December 11, 1917	Salado Creek, Texas	Premeditated murder, mutiny, and willfully disobeying a superior commissioned officer	14 people, white	Woodrow Wilson
Thomas C. Hawkins	Black	24	December 11, 1917	Salado Creek, Texas	Premeditated murder, mutiny, and willfully disobeying a superior commissioned officer	14 people, white	Woodrow Wilson
Frank Johnson	Black		December 11, 1917	Salado Creek, Texas	Premeditated murder, mutiny, and willfully disobeying a superior commissioned officer	14 people, white	Woodrow Wilson
Pat McWhorter	Black	24	December 11, 1917	Salado Creek, Texas	Premeditated murder, mutiny, and willfully disobeying a superior commissioned officer	14 people, white	Woodrow Wilson
Jesse Moore	Black	27	December 11, 1917	Salado Creek, Texas	Premeditated murder, mutiny, and willfully disobeying a superior commissioned officer	14 people, white	Woodrow Wilson
William C. Nesbit	Black	30	December 11, 1917	Salado Creek, Texas	Premeditated murder, mutiny, and willfully disobeying a superior commissioned officer	14 people, white	Woodrow Wilson
Carlos Snodgrass	Black	24	December 11, 1917	Salado Creek, Texas	Premeditated murder, mutiny, and willfully disobeying a superior commissioned officer	14 people, white	Woodrow Wilson
James Wheatley	Black	26	December 11, 1917	Salado Creek, Texas	Premeditated murder, mutiny, and willfully disobeying a superior commissioned officer	14 people, white	Woodrow Wilson
Risley W. Young	Black	40	December 11, 1917	Salado Creek, Texas	Premeditated murder, mutiny, and willfully disobeying a superior commissioned officer	14 people, white	Woodrow Wilson
John B. Mann	Black	21	April 5, 1918	Camp Logan, Texas	Premeditated murder	Ralph Morton Foley, 20, white	Woodrow Wilson
Walter Matthews	Black		April 5, 1918	Camp Logan, Texas	Premeditated murder	Ralph Morton Foley, 20, white	Woodrow Wilson
Stanley Tramble	Black	31	July 5, 1918	Camp Dodge, Iowa	Rape	Jessie Barnes, 17, white	Woodrow Wilson
Nelson Johnson	Black	30	July 5, 1918	Camp Dodge, Iowa	Rape	Jessie Barnes, 17, white	Woodrow Wilson
Fred Allen	Black	22	July 5, 1918	Camp Dodge, Iowa	Rape	Jessie Barnes, 17, white	Woodrow Wilson
Nat Hoffman	White	25	July 11, 1918	Camp MacArthur, Texas	Rape	Female, 11, white (Note: Also attacked a boy who was about the same age as the girl, then attacked the girl after the boy escaped.)	Woodrow Wilson
Charles E. Chambers	Black	23	July 13, 1918	Bazoilles-sur-Meuse, France, European Theater	Rape	Marie Lapotre, 68, white	Woodrow Wilson
	Black		August 30, 1918	France, European Theater	Rape	Female, 54, white	Woodrow Wilson
William Buckner	Black	19	September 6, 1918	France, European Theater	Rape	Georgette Thiebau, 23, white	Woodrow Wilson
Babe Collier	Black	30	September 17, 1918	Fort Sam Houston, Texas	Premeditated murder, mutiny, and willfully disobeying a superior commissioned officer (Note: All defendants convicted in the Houston riot of 1917 had their convictions posthumously vacated in 2023 on the grounds that they had not received fair trials.)	14 people, white (Note: E. A. Thompson, A.R. Carstens, M. Gerado, Fred J. Winkler, C.W. Wright, Earl Findley, R.H. Daniels, Horace Moodey, Joseph W. Mattes, Melvin D. Everton, E. S. Meineke, Ira D. Rainey, S. Satton, and Eli Smith.)	Woodrow Wilson
Thomas McDonald	Black	29	September 17, 1918	Fort Sam Houston, Texas	Premeditated murder, mutiny, and willfully disobeying a superior commissioned officer	14 people, white	Woodrow Wilson
James Robinson	Black		September 17, 1918	Fort Sam Houston, Texas	Premeditated murder, mutiny, and willfully disobeying a superior commissioned officer	14 people, white	Woodrow Wilson
Joseph Smith	Black		September 17, 1918	Fort Sam Houston, Texas	Premeditated murder, mutiny, and willfully disobeying a superior commissioned officer	14 people, white	Woodrow Wilson
Albert D. Wright	Black		September 17, 1918	Fort Sam Houston, Texas	Premeditated murder, mutiny, and willfully disobeying a superior commissioned officer	14 people, white	Woodrow Wilson
William D. Boone	Black		September 25, 1918	Fort Sam Houston, Texas	Premeditated murder, mutiny, and willfully disobeying a superior commissioned officer	14 people, white	Woodrow Wilson
James Favors	Black	25	November 8, 1918	France, European Theater	Rape	Female, 38, white	Woodrow Wilson
	Black		January 24, 1919	France, European Theater	Rape	Female, child, white	Woodrow Wilson
Joe Cathey	Black	28	April 4, 1919	Is-sur-Tille, France, European Theater	Premeditated murder	Male, adult, white (Note: Also convicted of the attempted rape of the victim's daughter.)	Woodrow Wilson
Clair L. Blodgett	White	22	April 25, 1919	Is-sur-Tille, France, European Theater	Rape	Female, 8, white	Woodrow Wilson
Henry Williams	Black		June 20, 1919	France, European Theater	Premeditated murder and rape	Male and female, adult and child, white	Woodrow Wilson
Sercy Strong	Black	28	June 20, 1919	France, European Theater	Premeditated murder and rape	Male and female, adult and child, white	Woodrow Wilson
Charles F. Witham	White	25	June 20, 1919	Gièvres, France, European Theater	Premeditated murder	Male, white (military policeman)	Woodrow Wilson

=== Executions during the interwar period ===
Only one confirmed execution was carried out by the United States Army during the interwar period. In 1926, U.S. Army Lieutenant John Sewell Thompson was executed by hanging for the murder of his fiancée. He was the first American officer executed in peacetime, and to date, he is the only graduate of the United States Military Academy to have been executed.

Name	Age	Race	Date of execution	Location	Crime	Victim(s)	President
John Sewell Thompson	27	White	March 18, 1926	Fort McKinley, Philippines	Premeditated murder	Audrey Burleigh, 17, white (fiancée)	Calvin Coolidge

=== Executions by the Army during World War II and up to 1948 ===
The United States Army carried out 141 known executions of US servicemen over a three-year period from 1942 to January 1946 and a further six executions were conducted between September 1946 and December 1948, for a known total of 147.

These figures encompass US military personnel convicted of various offences and do not include individuals executed by the US Army after being convicted by US military courts for violations of the laws of war, including about 18 German soldiers who were shot after being caught in American uniform as part of Operation Greif during the Battle of the Bulge, persons caught engaging in actions of espionage against US forces, or soldiers/civilians convicted by US military courts of having committed crimes against American military personnel, including as occurred at Rüsselsheim, Germany in 1944 and elsewhere. Evidence suggests that other persons, both American military personnel or enemy combatants/civilians, may have been executed during the Second World War or during the occupation of Germany/Japan pursuant to verdicts by American military tribunals or decisions taken by senior commanders.

Of the 141 known wartime executions of U.S. soldiers by the U.S. Armed Forces, 70 were carried out in the European Theatre, 27 in the Mediterranean Theatre, 21 in the Southwest Pacific Area, 19 in the contiguous United States, two in Hawaii, one in Guadalcanal and one in India. Of the six postwar executions, one took place in Hawaii, one in Japan, two in France, and two in the Philippines. Another execution was carried out by the United States Air Force in Japan in 1950.

All executions carried out by the Army from 1942 to 1948 were performed under the authority of the Articles of War of June 4, 1920, an Act of Congress which governed military justice between 1920 and 1951.

This list includes members of the United States Army Air Forces, which was a part of the Army until September 18, 1947, when it became independent. Executions by the United States Air Force after 1947 are listed separately. This list does not include the executions of American military personnel who were tried under any jurisdiction other than the U.S. Armed Forces. For example, Karl Hulten, an AWOL U.S. Army soldier who was executed in 1945 for the Cleft chin murder, was tried by a British civilian court since he had committed the crime with a British accomplice.

With the exception of Eddie Slovik, who was shot for desertion, all of these soldiers were executed for murder and/or rape. Several of the soldiers listed as convicted and executed for murder and/or rape had also been convicted of other charges, including those of a military nature such as desertion and mutiny, plus lesser crimes that would not have been considered capital unless combined with more serious offenses which carried the death penalty.

Sources for list in References section.

Name	Race	Age	Date of execution	Location	Method	Crime	Victim(s)	President
James Rowe	Black	36	November 6, 1942	Fort Huachuca, Arizona	Hanging	Premeditated murder	Joseph Shields, 21, black	Franklin D. Roosevelt
Edward Joseph Leonski	White	24	November 9, 1942	Pentridge Prison, Melbourne, Australia, Southwest Pacific Area	Hanging	Premeditated murder (3 specifications)	Three people, white (Note: Ivy Violet McLeod, 40, Pauline Thompson, 30, and Gladys Hosking, 40.)	Franklin D. Roosevelt
Jerry Sykes	Black	26	January 19, 1943	Fort Huachuca, Arizona	Hanging	Premeditated murder	Hazel Lee Craig, 26, black	Franklin D. Roosevelt
David Cobb	Black	21	March 12, 1943	Shepton Mallet, United Kingdom, European Theater	Hanging	Premeditated murder	Robert James Cobner, 25, white	Franklin D. Roosevelt
George Schubert Knapp	White	38	March 19, 1943	Bastrop, Texas	Hanging	Premeditated murder and rape	Lucy Rivers Maynard, 8, white	Franklin D. Roosevelt
Francis Albert Line	White	27	March 26, 1943	Davis–Monthan Air Force Base, Arizona	Hanging	Rape	Eunice Howard, 12, white (Note: Previously raped a 14-year-old white girl in Utah in 1942, but received a suspended sentence and was allowed to return to the Army after pleading guilty to a lesser charge of carnal knowledge. Also confessed to raping a 13-year-old white girl in Utah two weeks earlier and murdering a man in Arizona in 1937.)	Franklin D. Roosevelt
Harold Adolphus Smith	White	20	June 25, 1943	Shepton Mallet, United Kingdom, European Theater	Hanging	Premeditated murder	Harry Mosby Jenkins, 25, white	Franklin D. Roosevelt
James E. Kendrick	White	21	July 17, 1943	Oran, Algeria, North African Theater of Operations	Hanging	Premeditated murder and rape	Carmen Nunez, 10, white	Franklin D. Roosevelt
Levi Brandon	Black	23	July 26, 1943	Fort Leavenworth, Kansas	Hanging	Rape	Darline Carl, 16, white (Note: Also convicted of the attempted rape of Mary Elizabeth Ruiz (20, white).)	Franklin D. Roosevelt
Walter J. Bohn	White	26	August 6, 1943	Camp Claiborne, Louisiana	Hanging	Rape	Esther E. Ruttkay, 26, white	Franklin D. Roosevelt
Willie A. Pittman	Black	25	August 30, 1943	Sicily, Mediterranean Theatre of World War II	Hanging	Rape	Giovianana Incatasciato Morana, white	Franklin D. Roosevelt
Harvey Stroud	Black	22	August 30, 1943	Sicily, Mediterranean Theatre of World War II	Hanging	Rape	Giovianana Incatasciato Morana, white	Franklin D. Roosevelt
Armstead White	Black	29	August 30, 1943	Sicily, Mediterranean Theatre of World War II	Hanging	Rape	Giovianana Incatasciato Morana, white	Franklin D. Roosevelt
David White	Black	24	August 30, 1943	Sicily, Mediterranean Theatre of World War II	Hanging	Rape	Giovianana Incatasciato Morana, white	Franklin D. Roosevelt
Charles H. Smith	White	33	September 6, 1943	Algiers, North African Theater of Operations	Hanging	Premeditated murder	William Lynn Tackett, 21, white (military policeman)	Franklin D. Roosevelt
Lee Andrew Davis	Black	20	December 14, 1943	Shepton Mallet, United Kingdom, European Theater	Hanging	Premeditated murder and rape	June Lay (murdered), 19, and Muriel Joyce Rosalie Fawden (raped), 22, white	Franklin D. Roosevelt
Edwin P. Jones	White	23	January 5, 1944	Oran, Algeria, North African Theater of Operations	Hanging	Premeditated murder	Alfred Edwin Raby, 28, white	Franklin D. Roosevelt
John H. Waters	White	38	February 10, 1944	Shepton Mallet, United Kingdom, European Theater	Hanging	Premeditated murder	Doris May Staples, 35, white	Franklin D. Roosevelt
John C. Leatherberry	Black	22	March 16, 1944	Shepton Mallet, United Kingdom, European Theater	Hanging	Premeditated murder	Harry Claude Hailstone, 28, white	Franklin D. Roosevelt
Charles E. Spears	Black	33	April 18, 1944	Aversa, Italy, Mediterranean Theatre	Hanging	Premeditated murder	David Quick, 35, Hispanic	Franklin D. Roosevelt
Wiley Harris Jr.	Black	25	May 26, 1944	Shepton Mallet, United Kingdom, European Theater	Hanging	Premeditated murder	Henry "Harry" Coogan, white	Franklin D. Roosevelt
Alex Flores Miranda	Hispanic	20	May 30, 1944	Shepton Mallet, United Kingdom, European Theater	Firing squad	Premeditated murder	Thomas Evison, 43, white	Franklin D. Roosevelt
Robert L. Donnelly	White	19	May 31, 1944	Aversa, Italy, Mediterranean Theatre	Hanging	Premeditated murder and desertion	John P. Brown Jr., 28, white (military policeman)	Franklin D. Roosevelt
Eliga Brinson	Black	25	August 11, 1944	Shepton Mallet, United Kingdom, European Theater	Hanging	Rape	Dorothy Holmes, 16, white	Franklin D. Roosevelt
Willie Smith	Black	22	August 11, 1944	Shepton Mallet, United Kingdom, European Theater	Hanging	Rape	Dorothy Holmes, 16, white	Franklin D. Roosevelt
Clarence Whitfield	Black	20	August 14, 1944	Normandy, France, European Theater	Hanging	Rape	Aniela Skrzyniarz, white (Note: Also convicted of the attempted rape of Skrzyniarz's sister, Zofia Skrzyniarz.)	Franklin D. Roosevelt
Ray Watson	Black	24	August 29, 1944	Aversa, Italy, Mediterranean Theatre	Hanging	Premeditated murder	John Henry Brockman, 22, white (military policeman)	Franklin D. Roosevelt
James W. Peoples	Black	29	September 2, 1944	New Guinea Detention and Rehabilitation Center, Oro Bay, New Guinea, Southwest Pacific Area	Hanging	Premeditated murder	Alonzo D. McIntyre, 22, black	Franklin D. Roosevelt
Harry Bever	White	28	September 26, 1944	Fort Sill, Oklahoma	Hanging	Premeditated murder	Clinton C. Wood, 44, white	Franklin D. Roosevelt
Arthur T. Brown	Black	20	October 2, 1944	New Guinea Detention and Rehabilitation Center, Oro Bay, New Guinea, Southwest Pacific Area	Hanging	Rape and mutiny	Ruth Reissinger Irvine, 25, white (Note: Also convicted of the attempted gang rape of Marie Weaver (22, white).)	Franklin D. Roosevelt
Andrew Gibson	Black		October 2, 1944	New Guinea Detention and Rehabilitation Center, Oro Bay, New Guinea, Southwest Pacific Area	Hanging	Rape and mutiny	Ruth Reissinger Irvine, 25, white	Franklin D. Roosevelt
Leroy E. Greene	Black	24	October 2, 1944	New Guinea Detention and Rehabilitation Center, Oro Bay, New Guinea, Southwest Pacific Area	Hanging	Rape and mutiny	Ruth Reissinger Irvine, 25, white	Franklin D. Roosevelt
Charles A. Horn	Black	20	October 2, 1944	New Guinea Detention and Rehabilitation Center, Oro Bay, New Guinea, Southwest Pacific Area	Hanging	Rape and mutiny	Ruth Reissinger Irvine, 25, white	Franklin D. Roosevelt
Eugene A. Washington Jr.	Black	21	October 2, 1944	New Guinea Detention and Rehabilitation Center, Oro Bay, New Guinea, Southwest Pacific Area	Hanging	Rape and mutiny	Ruth Reissinger Irvine, 25, white	Franklin D. Roosevelt
Lloyd L. White Jr.	Black	21	October 2, 1944	New Guinea Detention and Rehabilitation Center, Oro Bay, New Guinea, Southwest Pacific Area	Hanging	Rape and lifting up a weapon against a superior officer	Ruth Reissinger Irvine, 25, white	Franklin D. Roosevelt
Madison Thomas	Black	23	October 12, 1944	Shepton Mallet, United Kingdom, European Theater	Hanging	Rape	Beatrice Maud Reynolds, 59, white	Franklin D. Roosevelt
Roy W. Anderson	Black	27	October 25, 1944	Seine Disciplinary Training Center, Paris, France, European Theater	Hanging	Rape (2 specifications)	Jeanne Martin and Louise Bocage, 28 and 26, white	Franklin D. Roosevelt
James Buck Sanders	Black	27	October 25, 1944	Seine Disciplinary Training Center, Paris, France, European Theater	Hanging	Rape (2 specifications)	Jeanne Martin and Louise Bocage, 28 and 26, white	Franklin D. Roosevelt
Paul Mauritz Kluxdal	White	37	October 31, 1944	Seine Disciplinary Training Center, Paris, France, European Theater	Hanging	Premeditated murder	Loyce M. Robertson, 26, white	Franklin D. Roosevelt
Joseph Watson	Black	26	November 9, 1944	Seine Disciplinary Training Center, Paris, France, European Theater	Hanging	Rape	Marie Josef Gourdin, 33, white	Franklin D. Roosevelt
Willie Wimberly Jr.	Black	32	November 9, 1944	Seine Disciplinary Training Center, Paris, France, European Theater	Hanging	Rape	Marie Josef Gourdin, 33, white	Franklin D. Roosevelt
Avelino Fernandez	Hispanic	30	November 15, 1944	New Guinea Detention and Rehabilitation Center, Oro Bay, New Guinea, Southwest Pacific Area	Hanging	Premeditated murder	Doris May Roberts, 34, white/aboriginal	Franklin D. Roosevelt
Curtis L. Maxey	Black	21	November 16, 1944	Aversa, Italy, Mediterranean Theatre	Hanging	Rape	Lucy Collomp, 22, white	Franklin D. Roosevelt
William Drew Pennyfeather	Black	24	November 18, 1944	Fort du Roule, Cherbourg, France, European Theater	Hanging	Rape	Julia Herbaut, white	Franklin D. Roosevelt
Richard Bunney Scott	Black	28	November 18, 1944	Fort du Roule, Cherbourg, France, European Theater	Hanging	Rape	Marie Dupont, white (pregnant)	Franklin D. Roosevelt
Theron Watts McGann	White	23	November 20, 1944	Saint-Lô, Manche, France, European Theater	Hanging	Rape	Yvonne Emilienne Eugenia Vaudevire, 39, white	Franklin D. Roosevelt
Arthur Eddie Davis	Black	25	November 22, 1944	Montours, Ille-et-Vilaine, France, European Theater	Hanging	Rape	Aimée Hellondais Honore, 37, white	Franklin D. Roosevelt
Charles H. Jordan	Black	24	November 22, 1944	Montours, Ille-et-Vilaine, France, European Theater	Hanging	Rape	Aimée Hellondais Honore, 37, white	Franklin D. Roosevelt
James E. Hendricks	Black	21	November 24, 1944	Normandy, France, European Theater	Hanging	Premeditated murder	Victor Bignon, white (Note: Also convicted of the attempted rape of Victor's wife, Noémie Bignon.)	Franklin D. Roosevelt
Benjamin Pygate	Black	35	November 28, 1944	Shepton Mallet, United Kingdom, European Theater	Firing squad	Premeditated murder	James Edward Alexander, 19, black	Franklin D. Roosevelt
Oscar Neil Newman	White	26	November 29, 1944	Beaunay, Marne, France, European Theater	Hanging	Rape	Raymonde Dehu, 17, white	Franklin D. Roosevelt
Leo Valentine Sr.	Black	20	November 29, 1944	Beaunay, Marne, France, European Theater	Hanging	Rape	Raymonde Dehu, 17, white	Franklin D. Roosevelt
Charlie B. Williams	Black	26	December 18, 1944	Army Air Forces Tactical Center, Orlando, Florida	Hanging	Premeditated murder (2 specifications)	Howard J. Robertson and William Robinson, 20, black (military policemen)	Franklin D. Roosevelt
William E. Davis	Black	29	December 27, 1944	Guiclan, Finistère, France, European Theater	Hanging	Premeditated murder	Marie Françoise Pouliquen, 23, white (Note: Also convicted of the attempted rape of the victim.)	Franklin D. Roosevelt
Sylvester Davis	Black	25	January 5, 1945	Randolph Air Force Base, Texas	Hanging	Premeditated murder	Peggy Lou Arnold, 20, white	Franklin D. Roosevelt
Augustine M. Guerra	Hispanic	20	January 8, 1945	Shepton Mallet, United Kingdom, European Theater	Hanging	Premeditated murder and rape	Betty Dorian Pearl Green, 15, white	Franklin D. Roosevelt
Ernest L. Clark	White	24	January 8, 1945	Shepton Mallet, United Kingdom, European Theater	Hanging	Premeditated murder and rape	Betty Dorian Pearl Green, 15, white	Franklin D. Roosevelt
John David Cooper	Black	22	January 9, 1945	Lérouville, Meuse, France, European Theater	Hanging	Rape (4 specifications)	Four people, white (Note: Lucienne Barry, 40, Germaine Pivel, 18, Christiane Pivel, 14, and Mireille Weber, 14.)	Franklin D. Roosevelt
John J. O'Connor	White	20	January 15, 1945	Fort Benning, Georgia	Hanging	Premeditated murder	Richard N. Campbell, 18, white	Franklin D. Roosevelt
Walter James Baldwin	Black	22	January 17, 1945	Beaufay, Sarthe, France, European Theater	Hanging	Premeditated murder	Adolphe Paul Drouin, 47, white	Franklin D. Roosevelt
Arthur J. Farrell	White	38	January 19, 1945	Saint-Sulpice-des-Landes, Ille-et-Vilaine, France, European Theater	Hanging	Rape	Lucie Hualle, 57, white	Franklin D. Roosevelt
James W. Twiggs	Black	25	January 22, 1945	Loire Disciplinary Training Center, Le Mans, France, European Theater	Hanging	Premeditated murder	William D. Adams, 30, black	Franklin D. Roosevelt
Samuel Hawthorne	Black	24	January 29, 1945	New Guinea Detention and Rehabilitation Center, Oro Bay, New Guinea, Southwest Pacific Area	Hanging	Premeditated murder (2 specifications)	Herman Cecil Zwang and Peter Astranis, 27 and 30, white	Franklin D. Roosevelt
Mervin Holden	Black	24	January 30, 1945	Citadel of Namur, Namur, Belgium	Hanging	Rape	Henriette Tillieu Ep Deremince, 51, white	Franklin D. Roosevelt
Elwood J. Spencer	Black	20	January 30, 1945	Citadel of Namur, Namur, Belgium	Hanging	Rape	Henriette Tillieu Ep Deremince, 51, white	Franklin D. Roosevelt
Eddie Slovik	White	24	January 31, 1945	Sainte-Marie-aux-Mines, France, European Theater	Firing squad	Desertion (Note: Prior to his court-martial, Slovik was given multiple chances to rejoin his unit and destroy his written confession without facing any consequences, but refused. He also declined to present any mitigation when given the opportunity.)	N/A	Franklin D. Roosevelt
J.P. Wilson	Black	27	February 2, 1945	Lérouville, Meuse, France, European Theater	Hanging	Rape (4 specifications)	Four people, white (Note: Lucienne Barry, 40, Germaine Pivel, 18, Christiane Pivel, 14, and Mireille Weber, 14.)	Franklin D. Roosevelt
Robert L. Skinner	Black	20	February 10, 1945	Bricquebec, Manche, France, European Theater	Hanging	Rape	Marie Osouf, 19, white	Franklin D. Roosevelt
Waiters Yancy	Black	21	February 10, 1945	Bricquebec, Manche, France, European Theater	Hanging	Premeditated murder and rape	Clement Lebarillier (murdered) and Marie Osouf (raped), both 19, white	Franklin D. Roosevelt
William Mack	Black	34	February 15, 1945	Plabennec, Finistère, France, European Theater	Hanging	Premeditated murder	Eugene Tournellec, 47, white	Franklin D. Roosevelt
Otis Bell Crews	Black	27	February 21, 1945	Aversa, Italy, Mediterranean Theatre	Hanging	Premeditated murder	Wilbur Lee Bryant, 19, white (military policeman)	Franklin D. Roosevelt
Williams Clifton Downes	Black	30	February 28, 1945	Étienville, Manche, France, European Theater	Hanging	Rape (3 specifications)	Three people, white (Note: Marie Lepoittevin, 62, Louise Lagouche, 15, and Louis Leveziel.)	Franklin D. Roosevelt
Amos Agee	Black	29	March 3, 1945	La Saussaye, Orne, France, European Theater	Hanging	Rape	Alexina Vingtier, 24, white	Franklin D. Roosevelt
John C. Smith	Black	27	March 3, 1945	La Saussaye, Orne, France, European Theater	Hanging	Rape	Alexina Vingtier, 24, white	Franklin D. Roosevelt
Frank Watson	Black	21	March 3, 1945	La Saussaye, Orne, France, European Theater	Hanging	Rape	Alexina Vingtier, 24, white	Franklin D. Roosevelt
Olin W. Williams	Black	23	March 9, 1945	Le Héron, Seine-Maritime, France, European Theater	Hanging	Premeditated murder and rape	Albert Lebocey (murdered) and Germaine Lebocey (raped), 45 and 44, white	Franklin D. Roosevelt
Lee A. Burns	Black	31	March 11, 1945	Aversa, Italy, Mediterranean Theatre	Hanging	Rape	Carla Sabatini, 14, white	Franklin D. Roosevelt
General Lee Grant	Black	23	March 11, 1945	Aversa, Italy, Mediterranean Theatre	Hanging	Premeditated murder	Carlo Franceschi, white	Franklin D. Roosevelt
Herman Perry	Black	22	March 15, 1945	Ledo, Assam, India	Hanging	Premeditated murder and desertion	Harold Cady, 28, white	Franklin D. Roosevelt
Robert L. Pearson	Black	21	March 17, 1945	Shepton Mallet, United Kingdom, European Theater	Hanging	Rape	Joyce Broome, 26, white (pregnant)	Franklin D. Roosevelt
Cubia Jones	Black	25	March 17, 1945	Shepton Mallet, United Kingdom, European Theater	Hanging	Rape	Joyce Broome, 26, white (pregnant)	Franklin D. Roosevelt
Henry Baker	Black		March 18, 1945	Leyte, Philippines	Hanging	Rape	Maria Tabao Bautista, Filipino	Franklin D. Roosevelt
John H. Mack	Black	34	March 20, 1945	Aversa, Italy, Mediterranean Theatre	Hanging	Premeditated murder (3 specifications)	Three people, white (Note: Ettore Lombardi, his wife Palmira Lombardi, and their daughter Carmela Lombardi.)	Franklin D. Roosevelt
John W. Taylor	Black	26	March 20, 1945	Aversa, Italy, Mediterranean Theatre	Hanging	Premeditated murder	Earl Johnson, 44, black	Franklin D. Roosevelt
Kinney Bruce Jones	Black	31	March 20, 1945	Aversa, Italy, Mediterranean Theatre	Hanging	Premeditated murder	Milton M. Winstead, 19, black	Franklin D. Roosevelt
Robert A. Pearson	Black	29	March 20, 1945	Guadalcanal, Solomon Islands	Hanging	Premeditated murder	Frederick D. Johnson, 29, black	Franklin D. Roosevelt
Abraham Smalls	Black	34	March 27, 1945	Aversa, Italy, Mediterranean Theatre	Hanging	Premeditated murder	George W. Jones, 21, white	Franklin D. Roosevelt
Tommie Davison	Black	30	March 29, 1945	Manche, France, European Theater	Hanging	Rape	Madeleine Quellier, white	Franklin D. Roosevelt
William Harrison Jr.	White	22	April 7, 1945	Shepton Mallet, United Kingdom, European Theater	Hanging	Premeditated murder and rape	Patricia Wylie, 7, white	Franklin D. Roosevelt
Benjamin F. Hopper	Black	24	April 11, 1945	Loire Disciplinary Training Center, Le Mans, France, European Theater	Hanging	Premeditated murder	Randolph Jackson Jr., 19, black	Franklin D. Roosevelt
Dan Boswell	Black	27	April 16, 1945	Camp Bowie, Texas	Hanging	Premeditated murder	Otis Wilson, 26, black	Harry S. Truman
Curn L. Jones	Black	24	April 18, 1945	Fort Benning, Georgia	Hanging	Premeditated murder	Dooley Edwin Parnell, 36, white	Harry S. Truman
Milbert Bailey	Black	30	April 19, 1945	La Pernelle, Normandy, France, European Theater	Hanging	Premeditated murder and rape	Auguste Lefèbvre (murdered) and Marguerite Lefèbvre (raped), 52 and 19, white	Harry S. Truman
James L. Jones	Black	32	April 19, 1945	La Pernelle, Normandy, France, European Theater	Hanging	Premeditated murder and rape	Auguste Lefèbvre (murdered) and Marguerite Lefèbvre (raped), 52 and 19, white	Harry S. Truman
John Williams	Black	28	April 19, 1945	La Pernelle, Normandy, France, European Theater	Hanging	Premeditated murder and rape	Auguste Lefèbvre (murdered) and Marguerite Lefèbvre (raped), 52 and 19, white	Harry S. Truman
William T. Curry	Black	25	April 20, 1945	New Guinea Detention and Rehabilitation Center, Oro Bay, New Guinea, Southwest Pacific Area	Hanging	Premeditated murder	Robert J. Harris, black	Harry S. Truman
Shelton McGhee Sr.	Black	28	May 4, 1945	Aversa, Italy, Mediterranean Theatre	Hanging	Premeditated murder	George W. Brown, 24, black	Harry S. Truman
George Edward Smith Jr.	White	28	May 8, 1945	Shepton Mallet, United Kingdom, European Theater	Hanging	Premeditated murder	Eric Teichman, 60, white	Harry S. Truman
George Green Jr.	Black	21	May 15, 1945	Loire Disciplinary Training Center, Le Mans, France, European Theater	Hanging	Premeditated murder	Tommie Lee Garrett, 20, black	Harry S. Truman
Haze Heard	Black	22	May 21, 1945	Mesnil-Clinchamps, Calvados, France, European Theater	Hanging	Premeditated murder	Berthe Robert, white	Harry S. Truman
William J. McCarter	Black	38	May 28, 1945	Loire Disciplinary Training Center, Le Mans, France, European Theater	Hanging	Premeditated murder	Charles P. Williams, black	Harry S. Truman
Clete Oscar Norris	Black	27	May 31, 1945	Loire Disciplinary Training Center, Le Mans, France, European Theater	Hanging	Premeditated murder	William E. McDonald, 26, white	Harry S. Truman
Alvin R. Rollins	Black	20	May 31, 1945	Loire Disciplinary Training Center, Le Mans, France, European Theater	Hanging	Premeditated murder (2 specifications)	John H.W. Hoogewind and Royce Arthur Judd Jr., 32 and 22, white	Harry S. Truman
Matthew Clay Jr.	Black	24	June 4, 1945	Fontenay-sur-Mer, Manche, France, European Theater	Hanging	Premeditated murder	Victor Bellery, 42, white	Harry S. Truman
Werner E. Schmiedel	White	26	June 11, 1945	Aversa, Italy, Mediterranean Theatre	Hanging	Premeditated murder	Eolo Ferretti, 44, white	Harry S. Truman
Aniceto Martinez	Hispanic	23	June 15, 1945	Shepton Mallet, United Kingdom, European Theater	Hanging	Rape	Agnes Cope, 74, white	Harry S. Truman
Victor Ortiz	Hispanic	31	June 21, 1945	Loire Disciplinary Training Center, Le Mans, France, European Theater	Hanging	Premeditated murder	Ignacio Bonit, 32, Hispanic	Harry S. Truman
Willie Johnson	Black	23	June 26, 1945	La Haye-Pesnel, Normandy, France, European Theater	Hanging	Premeditated murder and rape	Julienne Fontaine, 32, white	Harry S. Truman
Fred Alex McMurray	Black	25	July 2, 1945	Aversa, Italy, Mediterranean Theatre	Hanging	Premeditated murder and rape (2 specifications)	Three people, white (Note: Anna Zanchi (murdered), Benni Lucrezia (raped), and Freida Mari (raped). Lucrezia and Mari were both pregnant. Lucrezia had a miscarriage the day after the attack.)	Harry S. Truman
Louis Till	Black	23	July 2, 1945	Aversa, Italy, Mediterranean Theatre	Hanging	Premeditated murder and rape (2 specifications)	Three people, white	Harry S. Truman
Charles H. Jefferies	Black	21	July 5, 1945	Aversa, Italy, Mediterranean Theatre	Hanging	Premeditated murder	Alfredo Bechelli, white	Harry S. Truman
John T. Jones	Black	32	July 5, 1945	Aversa, Italy, Mediterranean Theatre	Hanging	Rape	Ireni Rossi Martini, white	Harry S. Truman
Henry W. Nelson	Black	21	July 5, 1945	Aversa, Italy, Mediterranean Theatre	Hanging	Rape	Ireni Rossi Martini, white	Harry S. Truman
Tom E. Gordon	Black	30	July 10, 1945	Loire Disciplinary Training Center, Le Mans, France, European Theater	Hanging	Premeditated murder	Laurence Broussard, 24, black	Harry S. Truman
Harold Crabtree	White	26	July 31, 1945	Luzon, Philippines	Firing squad	Premeditated murder	Gene Culver Musson, 21, white	Harry S. Truman
Jesse D. Boston	Black	35	August 1, 1945	Schofield Barracks, Hawai'i	Firing squad	Premeditated murder	Shizue Saito, 35, Japanese	Harry S. Truman
Cornelius Thomas	Black	23	August 1, 1945	Schofield Barracks, Hawai'i	Hanging	Premeditated murder	Francis Timothy Silva, white	Harry S. Truman
Robert Davidson	Black	28	August 6, 1945	Camp Gordon Johnston, Florida	Firing squad	Premeditated murder	Melvin McClellon, 33, black	Harry S. Truman
Ernest J. Harris	Black		August 9, 1945	Luzon, Philippines	Hanging	Premeditated murder	Phillip Taylor, 21, black	Harry S. Truman
Lee R. Davis	Black	20	August 14, 1945	Fort Sill, Oklahoma	Hanging	Rape (2 speicifications)	Gertrude Catherine Mayeux, 22, white (Note: Also convicted of the attempted rape of Rosa Chevalier (61, white))	Harry S. Truman
Herbert W. Reid	Black	21	August 14, 1945	Camp Beale, California	Hanging	Rape	Betty Ann Roper, 15, white	Harry S. Truman
Clinton Stevenson	Black	30	August 14, 1945	Camp Beale, California	Hanging	Premeditated murder	King David Blanshaw Jr., 28, black	Harry S. Truman
Ellis McCloud Jr.	Black	27	August 20, 1945	Luzon, Philippines	Hanging	Premeditated murder	Jack C. McLain, 26, white	Harry S. Truman
Robert Wray	Black	24	August 20, 1945	Loire Disciplinary Training Center, Le Mans, France, European Theater	Hanging	Premeditated murder	Billy Basil Betts, 27, white	Harry S. Truman
Edward J. Reichl	White	39	August 22, 1945	United States Disciplinary Barracks, Fort Leavenworth, Kansas	Hanging	Premeditated murder	Adam Buchholz, 24, white	Harry S. Truman
Harvey W. Nichols	Black	27	August 28, 1945	Luzon, Philippines	Hanging	Premeditated murder	Martina Cervantes, 12, Filipino	Harry S. Truman
Albert Williams	Black		August 28, 1945	Luzon, Philippines	Hanging	Rape	Pacita Laluan Munar, 20, Filipino	Harry S. Truman
Bradley Walters Jr.	Black	20	August 31, 1945	Luzon, Philippines	Hanging	Premeditated murder	Leroy Maynard 21, white	Harry S. Truman
Henry Clay Philpot	Native American	28	September 10, 1945	Loire Disciplinary Training Center, Le Mans, France, European Theater	Hanging	Premeditated murder	John Bernard Platt, 28, white	Harry S. Truman
Clarence D. Gibson	Black	24	September 18, 1945	Lake Charles Air Force Station, Louisiana	Firing squad	Premeditated murder and desertion	Ralph S. Heimbach, 22, white (military policeman)	Harry S. Truman
Fred Hurse	Black	28	September 20, 1945	Camp Bowie, Texas	Hanging	Premeditated murder	Eugene Pinckney, 24, black	Harry S. Truman
James C. Thomas	Black	22	September 25, 1945	Luzon, Philippines	Hanging	Premeditated murder	James Harvey Clarke Jr., 25, white	Harry S. Truman
Charles M. Robinson	Black	22	September 28, 1945	Loire Disciplinary Training Center, Le Mans, France, European Theater	Hanging	Premeditated murder	Yvonne Louise Le Ny, 35, white	Harry S. Truman
Blake W. Mariano	Native American	29	October 10, 1945	Loire Disciplinary Training Center, Le Mans, France, European Theater	Hanging	Premeditated murder and rape	Märta Jenny Sofia Gary (murdered) and Babette Kuhndorfer (raped), 41 and 21, white (Note: Also convicted of the attempted rape of Elfriede Weissbarth (54, white).)	Harry S. Truman
Sidney Bennerman Jr.	Black	25	October 15, 1945	Les Milles, Aix-en-Provence, France, European Theater	Firing squad	Premeditated murder (2 specifications) and rape	Ulita Obichwist and Peter Lobacz, white	Harry S. Truman
Woodrow Parker	Black	27	October 15, 1945	Les Milles, Aix-en-Provence, France, European Theater	Firing squad	Premeditated murder (2 specifications) and rape	Ulita Obichwist and Peter Lobacz, white	Harry S. Truman
Ozell Louis	Black	23	October 15, 1945	Luzon, Philippines	Hanging	Premeditated murder	Lanardo Edradan, Filipino	Harry S. Truman
Charlie Ervin Jr.	Black	26	October 19, 1945	Aversa, Italy, Mediterranean Theatre	Firing squad	Premeditated murder (2 specifications) and rape	Three people, white (Note: Arnolfo Carresi (murdered), Maria Carresi (raped), and Pietro Testini (murdered).)	Harry S. Truman
Mansfield Spinks	Black	20	October 19, 1945	Aversa, Italy, Mediterranean Theatre	Firing squad	Premeditated murder (2 specifications) and rape	Three people, white	Harry S. Truman
Dan J. Lee	Black	37	November 9, 1945	Luzon, Philippines	Firing squad	Premeditated murder	Julian Esperanza, 58, Filipino	Harry S. Truman
Ellsworth Williams	Black	23	January 5, 1946	Mannheim Military Prison, Germany, European Theater	Hanging	Premeditated murder	Eddie Lee May, 26, black	Harry S. Truman
Solomon Thompson	Black	25	September 11, 1946	European Theater	Hanging	Premeditated murder	Cloyd A. Smith, 29, black	Harry S. Truman
Garlon Mickles	Black	23	April 22, 1947	Schofield Barracks, Hawai'i	Hanging	Rape	Frances Gitnick, white	Harry S. Truman
James Norman	Black	24/25	April 25, 1947	Luzon, Philippines	Hanging	Premeditated murder	Melitona Rarela, Filipino	Harry S. Truman
William Abney	Black	37	December 1, 1947	Mandaluyong, Philippines	Hanging	Premeditated murder	Nevaina Mills, 24, black	Harry S. Truman
Manuel Martinez	Hispanic	22	April 23, 1948	Landsberg Prison, Germany, European Theater	Hanging	Premeditated murder	Henri Géliot, white	Harry S. Truman
Stratman Armistead	Black	33	December 16, 1948	Nakano, Japan, Far East Command	Hanging	Premeditated murder (4 specifications)	Four people, Japanese (Note: Haru Fujisawa, 36, Kenji Haneishi, 49, Yasuhiko Haneishi, 9, and Masae Yamamoto, 8.)	Harry S. Truman

==== Plot E ====
The US Army executed 98 servicemen following General Courts Martial (GCM) for murder and/or rape in the European Theater of Operations during the Second World War. The remains of these servicemen were originally buried near the site of their executions, which took place in countries as far apart as England, France, Belgium, Germany, Italy and Algeria. In 1949 the remains of these men and a few others were re-interred in Plot E, a private section specifically built to hold what the Graves Registration referred to as "the dishonorable dead", since (per standard practice) all had been dishonorably discharged from the US Army just prior to their executions.

Plot "E" is detached from the main four cemetery plots for the honored dead of World War I at the Oise-Aisne American Cemetery and Memorial. It is located across the road, and deliberately hidden from view, inside a 100 x 50-foot oval-shaped clearing surrounded by hedges and hidden in thick forest. It is not mentioned on the ABMC website or in any guide pamphlets or maps. The plot is accessible only through the back door of the superintendent's office. Access is difficult and visitors are not encouraged, though the section is maintained by cemetery caretakers who periodically mow the lawn area and trim the hedges. One cemetery employee described Plot E as "a house of shame" and "a perfect anti-memorial". Today Plot E contains nothing but 96 flat stone markers (arranged in four rows) and a single small granite cross. The white grave markers are the size of index cards and have nothing on them except sequential grave numbers engraved in black. Two bodies were later disinterred and allowed to be returned to United States for reburial.

No US flag is permitted to fly over the section, and the numbered graves lie with their backs turned to the main cemetery on the other side of the road.

Three of the people buried in Plot E were not executed: Willie Hall, Joseph J. Mahoney and William N. Lucas, who all died while in military custody.

The only person interred who was not convicted of rape and/or murder was Eddie Slovik, who was executed for desertion on January 31, 1945. In 1987, President Ronald Reagan gave permission for Slovik's remains to be exhumed and returned to the United States for reburial. The remains of Alex F. Miranda were exhumed and returned to the United States in 1990.

==== Executions of German POWs during World War II ====
In 1945, the United States Army executed fourteen German prisoners of war by hanging at the United States Disciplinary Barracks, Fort Leavenworth, Kansas. The 14 POWs, members of the German armed services, had been convicted by general court-martial for the premeditated murders of fellow German prisoners believed by their fellow inmates to be collaborating as confidential informants with the United States military authorities. While the murders had been committed in 1943 and 1944, the executions were delayed until after the end of hostilities in Europe due to fears of German retaliation against Allied POWs.

The hangings were carried out in a warehouse elevator shaft which had been converted into a temporary gallows, and the fourteen Germans were buried in the Fort Leavenworth Military Prison Cemetery.

Name	Age	Race	Date of execution	Crime	Victim(s)	President
Walter Beyer	32	White	July 10, 1945	Premeditated murder	Johannes Kunze, 39, white	Harry S. Truman
Hans Demme	23	White	July 10, 1945	Premeditated murder	Johannes Kunze, 39, white	Harry S. Truman
Hans Schomer	27	White	July 10, 1945	Premeditated murder	Johannes Kunze, 39, white	Harry S. Truman
Willie Scholz	22	White	July 10, 1945	Premeditated murder	Johannes Kunze, 39, white	Harry S. Truman
Berthold Seidel	30	White	July 10, 1945	Premeditated murder	Johannes Kunze, 39, white	Harry S. Truman
Erich Gauss	32	White	July 14, 1945	Premeditated murder	Horst Günther, 23, white	Harry S. Truman
Rudolph Straub	39	White	July 14, 1945	Premeditated murder	Horst Günther, 23, white	Harry S. Truman
Helmut Fischer	22	White	August 25, 1945	Premeditated murder	Werner Drechsler, 22, white	Harry S. Truman
Fritz Franke	21	White	August 25, 1945	Premeditated murder	Werner Drechsler, 22, white	Harry S. Truman
Günter Külsen	22	White	August 25, 1945	Premeditated murder	Werner Drechsler, 22, white	Harry S. Truman
Heinrich Ludwig	25	White	August 25, 1945	Premeditated murder	Werner Drechsler, 22, white	Harry S. Truman
Bernhard Reyak	21	White	August 25, 1945	Premeditated murder	Werner Drechsler, 22, white	Harry S. Truman
Otto Stengel	26	White	August 25, 1945	Premeditated murder	Werner Drechsler, 22, white	Harry S. Truman
Rolf Wizuy	23	White	August 25, 1945	Premeditated murder	Werner Drechsler, 22, white	Harry S. Truman

== Executions by the Air Force ==
The United States Air Force executed three airmen by hanging between 1950 and 1954. The execution of Robert E. Keller was conducted under the authority of the 1920 Articles of War, and those of Robert Wesley Burns and Herman Perry Dennis Jr. were carried out under a short-lived revised version of the Articles of War popularly known as the Elston Act of 1948.

Name	Age	Race	Date of execution	Location	Crime	Victim(s)	President
Robert E. Keller	21	White	March 11, 1950	Nakano, Japan	Premeditated murder	Paul T. Wilburn, 19, white	Harry S. Truman
Robert Wesley Burns	37	Black	January 28, 1954	Guam	Premeditated murder and rape	Ruth Farnsworth, 27, white	Dwight D. Eisenhower
Herman Perry Dennis Jr.	25	Black	January 28, 1954	Guam	Premeditated murder and rape	Ruth Farnsworth, 27, white	Dwight D. Eisenhower

== Executions by the Navy and Coast Guard since 1929 ==
Historically, the United States Navy has executed seventeen sailors and Marines for various offenses. The most famous of these executions were those of three crew members of the USS Somers who were hanged without court-martial for conspiracy to mutiny in 1842. One of those hanged was Philip Spencer, the son of Secretary of War John C. Spencer.

As of 2026, no member of the U.S. Navy has been executed since 23 October 1849, when brothers John and Peter Black were simultaneously hanged at the yardarm for leading a mutiny on board the schooner Ewing.

The United States Navy hanged eight Japanese naval men, five Japanese army men, and one Japanese civilian police chief inspector for war crimes committed on Guam, Wake Island or elsewhere in the Pacific theatre during World War II.

Executions by the Navy

Name	Date of execution	President
Kōsō Abe (navy)	June 19, 1947	Harry S. Truman
Shigematsu Sakaibara (navy)	June 19, 1947	Harry S. Truman
Kikuji Ito (army)	June 19, 1947	Harry S. Truman
Noboru Nakajima (army)	June 19, 1947	Harry S. Truman
Koju Shoji (navy)	June 19, 1947	Harry S. Truman
Kiyoshi Takahashi (army)	June 19, 1947	Harry S. Truman
Yoshio Tachibana (army)	September 24, 1947	Harry S. Truman
Masaharu Tanaka (navy)	September 24, 1947	Harry S. Truman
Shizuo Yoshii (navy)	September 24, 1947	Harry S. Truman
Sueo Matoba (army)	September 24, 1947	Harry S. Truman
Tadao Igawa (police)	September 24, 1947	Harry S. Truman
Hiroshi Iwanami (navy)	January 17, 1949	Harry S. Truman
Shimpei Asano (navy)	March 31, 1949	Harry S. Truman
Chisato Ueno (navy)	March 31, 1949	Harry S. Truman

The United States Coast Guard executed Prohibition-era rum-runner James Alderman, who had been convicted of three counts of murder on the high seas, in 1929. The execution, the only one to be carried out by the Coast Guard as of 2026, was carried out under terms of the Coast Guard Act of 1915.

Execution by the Coast Guard

Name	Age	Race	Date of execution	Location	Crime	Victim(s)	President
James Alderman	45	White	August 17, 1929	Coast Guard Base Six, Florida	Murder	U.S. Coast Guardsman Sidney C. Sanderlin, Secret Service agent Robert K. Webster, Machinist Victor A. Lamby	Herbert Hoover

== See also ==
- Capital punishment by the United States military
- Capital punishment in the United States
- Military prison

== Sources ==
Information on listed military executions between 1942 and 1961 has been primarily derived from the following sources. Research on these executions continues.

1. A handwritten list, Executed Death Cases Before 1951, discovered at The Pentagon in December 2003. The list is only partially legible and must therefore be used with some caution. The linked public version of this list is quite truncated, thereby omitting a great deal of useful information about these cases. The supplemental addendum, Death Sentence Ledger, tracks military capital cases between 1950 and 1967.
2. Two tables of U.S. Soldiers executed during World War II's European Theater and Pacific Theater may be found on Before the Needle
3. The U.S. Rosters of World War II Dead, 1939–1945 (payment required) contains the names of many American servicemen executed by military authority overseas. These people are generally identified in the Rosters as GP (or General Prisoners) and were interred under the category of Administrative Decision.
4. The Nationwide Gravesite Locator contains the names of numerous executed soldiers, many of them listed as being General Prisoners.
5. The U.S. Veterans Gravesites, ca. 1775–2006 (payment required) contains the names of numerous executed soldiers, many of them listed as being General Prisoners.
6. Historical archives of the Stars and Stripes Newspaper, WWII Europe and North Africa Editions, 1942–1958 (payment required) contain numerous contemporary references to military executions.
7. Death Penalty Cases in WWII Military Courts: Lessons Learned from North Africa and Italy, a paper written by Professor J. Robert Lilly of the School of Law, Northern Kentucky University, and Associate Professor J. Michael Thomson of the Political Science Department Northern Kentucky University, and presented at the 41st Annual Meeting of the Academy of Criminal Justice Sciences March 10–13, 2004. Las Vegas, NV, contains statistical information on 97 executions carried out in the European Theatre and the Mediterranean Theatre of World War II. It does not appear to be available online at this time.
8. Taken by Force, by J. Robert Lilly, (ISBN 0-230-50647-X) published by Palgrave Macmillan in August 2007, discusses crimes of sexual violence committed by American soldiers in the Second World War. It contains numerous references to military capital cases during this period.
9. Official File, Court Martial Cases, Franklin D. Roosevelt Library, contains information on sentence confirmation dates of soldiers executed for capital crimes within the continental United States between 1942 and 1945.
10. Official File, Court Martial Cases, Harry Truman Museum and Library, contains information on sentence confirmation dates of soldiers and members of the Air Force executed between 1945 and 1954.
11. History of the JAG Branch Office, U.S. Forces, European Theater, 18 July 1942 to 1 Nov. 1945: n.a., Vol. 1–2, prep. by the Branch Office of the JAG-ETO, n.p ., n.d. (1946?), contains a summary on 70 military executions carried out in the European theater between 1943 and 1945.
12. Ted Darcy Casualty Database
13. Subchapter X, "Punitive Articles" of the Uniform Code of Military Justice
