= Johannes Kunze =

German World War II POW (1904–1943)

Wilhelm Reinhold Johannes Kunze (March 5, 1904 – November 4, 1943) was a German World War II prisoner of war (POW) held at Camp Tonkawa, Oklahoma. He was a Gefreiter in the Afrika Korps. Following a trial before a kangaroo court of 200 fellow prisoners on November 4, 1943, he was beaten to death by his fellow POWs since he had been spying for the Americans. He became a suspect of fellow prisoners of war after expressing defeatist comments and indifference to the outcome of the war.

The unmasking of Kunze happened by accident; he had been in the habit of passing notes to the American doctor at the camp during sick call. These notes contained useful information regarding the activities of various POWs in the camp, some still loyal Nazis. One day a new American doctor was on duty who did not know about Kunze's role as spy and who could not speak German. When Kunze handed over his note, the American doctor accidentally blew Kunze's cover by sending it back via another POW, who read the incriminating note and quickly realized that Kunze was a spy. News of this discovery spread quickly and soon afterwards Kunze was tried by a kangaroo court, after which a mob of at least 20 prisoners beat him to death. He is buried in the Fort Reno prisoner of war cemetery.

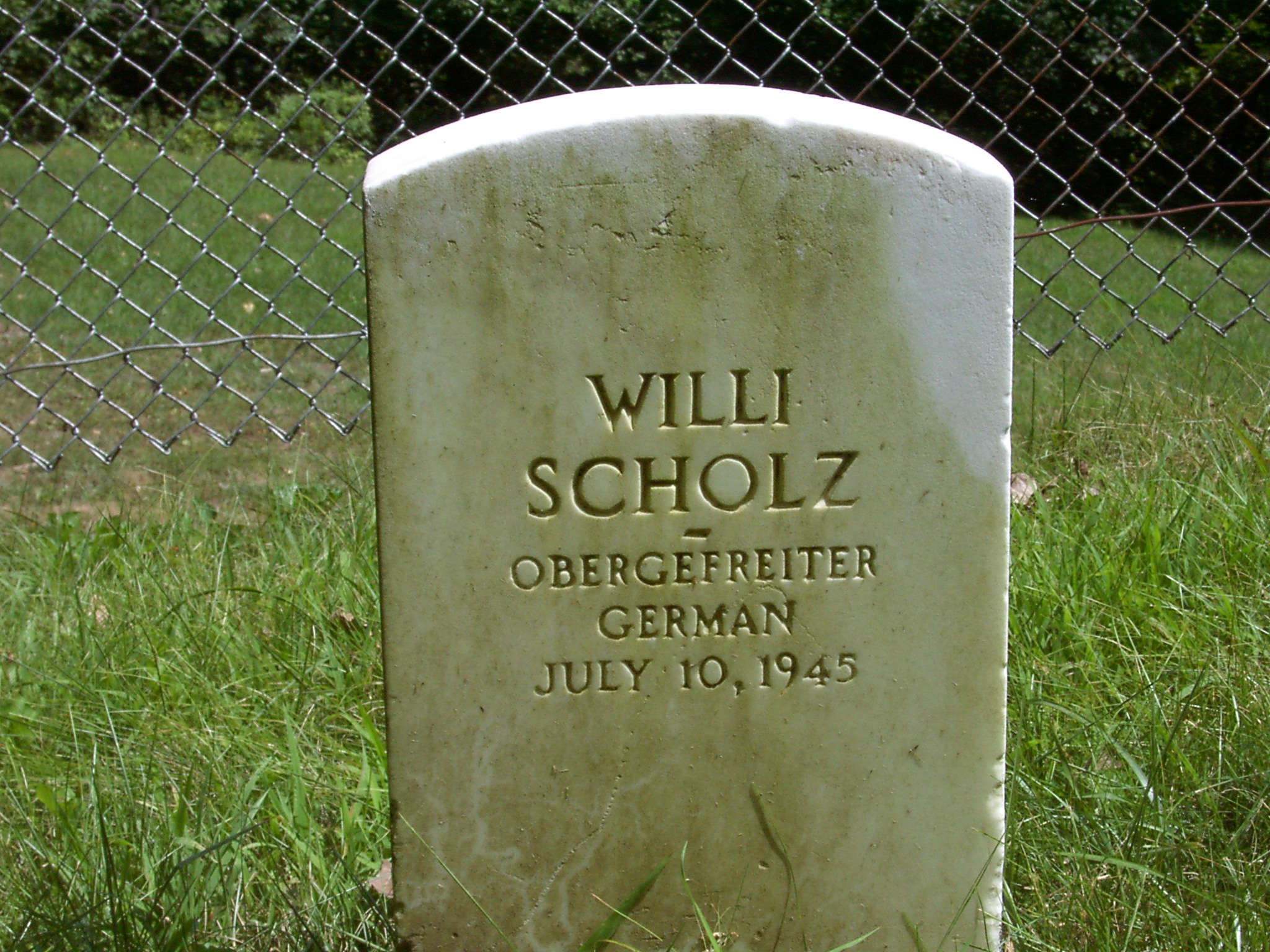
The headstone of Willi Scholz, who was convicted and hanged for murdering Kunze.

Five German POWs, whose uniforms were found to still have blood on them, were court-martialed for Kunze's murder. One of the prisoners, Walter Beyer, confessed to having called the meeting that ended in the murder. The case was prosecuted by Leon Jaworski, later the special prosecutor in the Watergate scandal. The trial took place at Camp Gruber near Muskogee. All five defendants were found guilty of premeditated murder and assault in commission of a riot, sentenced to death, and subsequently executed by hanging at the United States Disciplinary Barracks in Fort Leavenworth, Kansas on July 10, 1945. The death sentences were confirmed by President Franklin D. Roosevelt in October 1944, but the executions were delayed until after the end of the war in Europe due to the fear of reprisals against Allied prisoners held by Germany. Afterwards, the bodies of the executed men were buried in Fort Leavenworth Military Prison Cemetery.

Kunze's death is the subject of two nonfiction accounts: Vincent S. Green's Extreme Justice, and Wilma Parnell's Killing of Corporal Kunze.

== See also ==
- List of people executed by the United States military
- List of people executed in the United States in 1945
- Horst Günther
- Werner Drechsler
