= Vincent S. Green =

American writer (born 1953)

Vincent S. Green (born 1953) is an American writer. He is the author of three courtroom books: The Price of Victory (NAL 93); Extreme Justice, a nonfiction account of Leon Jaworski's prosecution of five German prisoners of war for the murder of an informer, Johannes Kunze (Pocket 95); and The Price of Justice (Endeavour Press 16). Green served as an Army JAGC and his first two books were drawn from this experience. He studied writing with National Book Award winner John Casey and was a Henry Hoyns Fellow at the University of Virginia MFA program. In the mid-90s he served as a State Representative in the South Dakota State Legislature. He subsequently moved to Los Angeles and returned to writing novels and practicing law.
