= List of people executed in the United States in 1945 =

One hundred and forty-two people, one hundred and forty-one male and one female, were executed in the United States in 1945, seventy-one by electrocution, thirty-four by gas chamber, thirty-three by hanging, and four by firing squad.

The military executed 27 people, including 14 German prisoners of war for the murders of three fellow German prisoners. The mass execution of seven German prisoners for the murder of Werner Drechsler would be the largest mass execution by hanging in the United States in the 20th century, not including the mass executions of Nazi war criminals by the military in Allied-occupied Germany.

== List of people executed in the United States in 1945 ==
No.	Date of execution	Name	Age of person			Gender	Ethnicity	State	Method	Ref.
No.	Date of execution	Name	At execution	At offense	Age difference	Gender	Ethnicity	State	Method	Ref.
1	January 4, 1945	Paul Alberts	23	Unknown	Unknown	Male	Black	Louisiana	Electrocution	
2	January 5, 1945	John Ernest Ransom	48	46	2	Male	Black	Arizona	Gas chamber	
3	January 5, 1945	Rollie Lee Anderson	29	28	1	Male	White	California	Gas chamber	
4	January 5, 1945	Theodore Gonzales	20	18	2	Male	Hispanic	California	Gas chamber	
5	January 5, 1945	Robert E. Lee Folkes	22	20	2	Male	Black	Oregon	Gas chamber	
6	January 5, 1945	Sylvester Davis	25	25	0	Male	Black	U.S. military	Hanging	
7	January 15, 1945	Henry Sparks	33	33	0	Male	Black	Florida	Electrocution	
8	January 15, 1945	Henry William Merten	32	30	2	Male	White	Oregon	Gas chamber	
9	January 15, 1945	Walter Lorne Wilson	28	27	1	Male	White	Oregon	Gas chamber	
10	January 15, 1945	John J. O'Connor	20	19	1	Male	White	U.S. military	Hanging	
11	January 18, 1945	George Thornton	29	28	1	Male	Black	Mississippi	Electrocution	
12	January 19, 1945	Henry Glass	21	20	1	Male	Black	Georgia	Electrocution	
13	January 19, 1945	Jimmie Lee Tye	22	21	1	Male	Black	Georgia	Electrocution	
14	February 2, 1945	Willie R. Jones	29	Unknown	Unknown	Male	Black	Virginia	Electrocution	
15	February 9, 1945	Charles Winfred Gilstrap	29	Unknown	Unknown	Male	White	South Carolina	Electrocution	
16	February 12, 1945	Albert Green	28	27	1	Male	Black	Florida	Electrocution	
17	February 23, 1945	William Jasper Jarrett	54	52	2	Male	White	Iowa	Hanging	
18	March 1, 1945	Holman Burney Thomas	41	40	1	Male	Black	Virginia	Electrocution	
19	March 2, 1945	Hurshel Glenn	24	23	1	Male	White	California	Gas chamber	
20	March 2, 1945	Ernest M. Keeling	26	25	1	Male	White	California	Gas chamber	
21	March 2, 1945	Djory Nagle	33	32	1	Male	White	California	Gas chamber	
22	March 2, 1945	Walter Fowler	22	Unknown	Unknown	Male	White	Georgia	Electrocution	
23	March 2, 1945	Willie Jackson	25	23	2	Male	Black	Georgia	Electrocution	
24	March 2, 1945	Raymond McDaniel	31	30	1	Male	White	Virginia	Electrocution	
25	March 4, 1945	Henry Williams	58	56	2	Male	Black	Texas	Electrocution	
26	March 5, 1945	Lena Baker	44	43	1	Female	Black	Georgia	Electrocution	
27	March 9, 1945	L. C. Johnson	19	19	0	Male	Black	Georgia	Electrocution	
28	March 9, 1945	Edmond V. Smith	39	38	1	Male	White	Georgia	Electrocution	
29	March 9, 1945	Elmer Hardie Biggs Jr.	20	18	2	Male	White	North Carolina	Gas chamber	
30	March 9, 1945	William Dalton Biggs	20	18	2	Male	White	North Carolina	Gas chamber	
31	March 9, 1945	John Edgar Messer	20	18	2	Male	White	North Carolina	Gas chamber	
32	March 16, 1945	Daniel F. Reedy	19	18	1	Male	White	Alabama	Electrocution	
33	March 16, 1945	Joseph H. Hockenberry	22	20	2	Male	White	Alabama	Electrocution	
34	March 16, 1945	Thomas Bass	29	26	3	Male	Black	Kentucky	Electrocution	
35	March 16, 1945	Tommy Nelson	36	35	1	Male	White	Kentucky	Electrocution	
36	March 23, 1945	William Fleming Usrey	41	39	2	Male	White	Mississippi	Electrocution	
37	March 23, 1945	Joseph Thomas MacAvoy	25	23	2	Male	White	Nebraska	Electrocution	
38	March 23, 1945	Amos Johnson	30	29	1	Male	Black	Oklahoma	Electrocution	
39	March 25, 1945	Robert J. Holloway	23	22	1	Male	Black	Texas	Electrocution	
40	March 30, 1945	Tony Brown	39	37	2	Male	Black	Arkansas	Electrocution	
41	March 30, 1945	James Chambers	32	32	0	Male	Black	West Virginia	Hanging	
42	April 6, 1945	Lee Albert Smith	62	60	2	Male	White	Arizona	Gas chamber	
43	April 6, 1945	Carl Fox	18	16	2	Male	Black	Kentucky	Electrocution	
44	April 6, 1945	James Willie Brown	28	27	1	Male	Black	Ohio	Electrocution	
45	April 6, 1945	James Cook Jenkins	24	23	1	Male	Black	Ohio	Electrocution	
46	April 13, 1945	U. L. Holley	38	38	0	Male	Black	Arizona	Gas chamber	
47	April 16, 1945	Dan Boswell	27	26	1	Male	Black	U.S. military	Hanging	
48	April 18, 1945	Curn L. Jones	24	23	1	Male	Black	U.S. military	Hanging	
49	April 20, 1945	James William Collett	60	59	1	Male	White	Ohio	Electrocution	
50	April 24, 1945	George Mansfield Hambrick	26	24	2	Male	Black	Tennessee	Electrocution	
51	April 27, 1945	Ulysses Gilbert	24	Unknown	Unknown	Male	Black	Georgia	Electrocution	
52	April 27, 1945	Henry Ruhl	36	34	2	Male	White	Federal government	Gas chamber	
53	May 1, 1945	Mancy Christian	27	27	0	Male	Black	Virginia	Electrocution	
54	May 11, 1945	Nathaniel Lamar	21	19	2	Male	Black	Georgia	Electrocution	
55	May 11, 1945	David Watkins	18	16	2	Male	Black	Georgia	Electrocution	
56	May 25, 1945	James Yates	21	Unknown	Unknown	Male	Black	Arkansas	Electrocution	
57	May 25, 1945	Silas James Kelso	25	Unknown	Unknown	Male	White	California	Gas chamber	
58	May 25, 1945	Edward Frank Hambrick Sr.	27	25	2	Male	Black	Kentucky	Electrocution	
59	May 25, 1945	Herbert Anderson	31	29	2	Male	Black	Louisiana	Electrocution	
60	May 25, 1945	Leo Lyles	21	18	3	Male	Black	Missouri	Gas chamber	
61	May 25, 1945	Horris Hill	23	Unknown	Unknown	Male	White	North Carolina	Gas chamber	
62	May 31, 1945	Eddie Simmons	Unknown	Unknown	3	Male	Black	Mississippi	Electrocution	
63	June 1, 1945	Edward Lee Green	23	Unknown	Unknown	Male	Black	Georgia	Electrocution	
64	June 8, 1945	Lacy Alexander McDaniel	34	33	1	Male	Black	North Carolina	Gas chamber	
65	June 15, 1945	Solomon Washington	30	29	1	Male	Black	Louisiana	Electrocution	
66	June 18, 1945	Nicholas A. Rossi	32	30	2	Male	White	Connecticut	Electrocution	
67	June 22, 1945	Emery Bolden	26	24	2	Male	Black	California	Gas chamber	
68	June 22, 1945	McElwee Harper	35	33	2	Male	Black	California	Gas chamber	
69	June 22, 1945	Howard Clarence Potts	41	39	2	Male	White	Colorado	Gas chamber	
70	June 22, 1945	Henry French	35	34	1	Male	Black	North Carolina	Gas chamber	
71	June 22, 1945	William M. Jones	53	Unknown	Unknown	Male	Black	North Carolina	Gas chamber	
72	June 29, 1945	Jack Roy Green	36	35	1	Male	Black	Georgia	Electrocution	
73	July 7, 1945	Julius Harper	18	17	1	Male	Black	Texas	Electrocution	
74	July 10, 1945	Walter Beyer	33	32	1	Male	White	U.S. military	Hanging	
75	July 10, 1945	Hans Demme	24	22	2	Male	White	U.S. military	Hanging	
76	July 10, 1945	Willi Scholz	23	21	2	Male	White	U.S. military	Hanging	
77	July 10, 1945	Hans Schomer	28	27	1	Male	White	U.S. military	Hanging	
78	July 10, 1945	Berthold Seidel	31	29	2	Male	White	U.S. military	Hanging	
79	July 13, 1945	James Joseph Roedl	27	24	3	Male	White	Utah	Firing squad	
80	July 14, 1945	Erich Gauss	32	31	1	Male	White	U.S. military	Hanging	
81	July 14, 1945	Rudolf Straub	39	38	1	Male	White	U.S. military	Hanging	
82	July 18, 1945	Billy Dixon	Unknown	Unknown	Unknown	Male	Black	Tennessee	Electrocution	
83	July 20, 1945	Ed Lucky Patton	45	44	1	Male	Black	Alabama	Electrocution	
84	July 20, 1945	Patrick Steven Murphy	39	36	3	Male	White	Maryland	Hanging	
85	July 25, 1945	William Henry Anderson	23	Unknown	Unknown	Male	Black	Florida	Electrocution	
86	July 28, 1945	Albert E. Smithwick	27	26	1	Male	White	Georgia	Electrocution	
87	August 1, 1945	Jesse D. Boston	35	35	0	Male	Black	U.S. military	Firing squad	
88	August 1, 1945	Cornelius Thomas	23	22	1	Male	Black	U.S. military	Hanging	
89	August 3, 1945	Lonnie Pearson	31	31	0	Male	Black	Virginia	Electrocution	
90	August 6, 1945	Robert Davidson	28	27	1	Male	Black	U.S. military	Firing squad	
91	August 14, 1945	Manuel Nino Diaz Camargo	22	Unknown	Unknown	Male	Hispanic	California	Gas chamber	
92	August 14, 1945	Lee R. Davis	20	19	1	Male	Black	U.S. military	Hanging	
93	August 14, 1945	Herbert W. Reid	21	20	1	Male	Black	U.S. military	Hanging	
94	August 14, 1945	Clinton Stevenson	30	30	0	Male	Black	U.S. military	Hanging	
95	August 17, 1945	Luther McClam	28	27	1	Male	Black	Maryland	Hanging	
96	August 22, 1945	Edward Joseph Reichl	39	38	1	Male	White	U.S. military	Hanging	
97	August 24, 1945	Robert Roy Gunnells	40	39	1	Male	White	Georgia	Electrocution	
98	August 24, 1945	Henry Hayes	27	26	1	Male	Black	Georgia	Electrocution	
99	August 25, 1945	Helmut Fischer	22	21	1	Male	White	U.S. military	Hanging	
100	August 25, 1945	Fritz Franke	21	20	1	Male	White	U.S. military	Hanging	
101	August 25, 1945	Guenther Kuelsen	22	20	2	Male	White	U.S. military	Hanging	
102	August 25, 1945	Heinrich Ludwig	25	24	1	Male	White	U.S. military	Hanging	
103	August 25, 1945	Bernhard Reyak	21	20	1	Male	White	U.S. military	Hanging	
104	August 25, 1945	Otto Stengel	26	25	1	Male	White	U.S. military	Hanging	
105	August 25, 1945	Rolf Wizuy	23	22	1	Male	White	U.S. military	Hanging	
106	September 2, 1945	Joseph W. Oglesby	21	21	0	Male	Black	Texas	Electrocution	
107	September 7, 1945	Joe Bill	30	30	0	Male	Native American	Washington	Hanging	
108	September 8, 1945	Elder Johnson	53	52	1	Male	Black	Ohio	Electrocution	
109	September 14, 1945	Thomas Earl Brigance	31	30	1	Male	White	California	Gas chamber	
110	September 14, 1945	Benjamin H. Whitson	27	25	2	Male	White	California	Gas chamber	
111	September 18, 1945	Clarence D. Gibson	24	22	2	Male	Black	U.S. military	Firing squad	
112	September 20, 1945	Fred Hurse	28	26	2	Male	Black	U.S. military	Hanging	
113	September 21, 1945	Charlie Johnson	27	Unknown	Unknown	Male	Black	Georgia	Electrocution	
114	October 3, 1945	Henry William Hagert	20	17	3	Male	White	Ohio	Electrocution	
115	October 5, 1945	Louie Lee Jackson	48	48	0	Male	Black	California	Gas chamber	
116	October 10, 1945	Charles C. Stewart	30	30	0	Male	Black	Ohio	Electrocution	
117	October 19, 1945	Kermit Breedlove	34	33	1	Male	Black	Illinois	Electrocution	
118	October 26, 1945	Donald Frederick Wood	26	25	1	Male	White	Mississippi	Electrocution	
119	October 26, 1945	Burnett Williams	24	24	0	Male	Black	North Carolina	Gas chamber	
120	October 29, 1945	Pleas Dixon	31	Unknown	Unknown	Male	Black	Florida	Electrocution	
121	October 29, 1945	Ernest Warren	29	Unknown	Unknown	Male	Black	Florida	Electrocution	
122	November 2, 1945	Edward Mays	55	55	0	Male	Black	North Carolina	Gas chamber	
123	November 5, 1945	Arthur DeGroat	35	34	1	Male	Black	New Jersey	Electrocution	
124	November 8, 1945	Frank Dudley Carter	25	22	3	Male	White	Ohio	Electrocution	
125	November 9, 1945	Charles Ford Silliman	36	34	2	Male	White	Colorado	Gas chamber	
126	November 9, 1945	Noah Collins	29	29	0	Male	Black	Georgia	Electrocution	
127	November 9, 1945	Jesse Craiton	23	22	1	Male	Black	Georgia	Electrocution	
128	November 9, 1945	Cliff Thomas Norman	29	28	1	Male	Black	Oklahoma	Electrocution	
129	November 16, 1945	William Edward Talbert	24	20	4	Male	Black	Missouri	Gas chamber	
130	November 23, 1945	Frank Hubert Martz	35	33	2	Male	White	Colorado	Gas chamber	
131	November 26, 1945	Cleveland Greathouse	64	63	1	Male	Black	Indiana	Electrocution	
132	November 27, 1945	Daniel Molnar Jr.	26	25	1	Male	White	New Jersey	Electrocution	
133	November 30, 1945	Albert J. Simeone	34	33	1	Male	White	California	Gas chamber	
134	November 30, 1945	Nathaniel Taylor	37	Unknown	Unknown	Male	Black	Georgia	Electrocution	
135	November 30, 1945	Donald H. Brooks	31	30	1	Male	White	Maryland	Hanging	
136	December 4, 1945	George Carter	29	Unknown	Unknown	Male	Black	South Carolina	Electrocution	
137	December 7, 1945	Anderson Daniel James Butler	23	23	0	Male	Black	Delaware	Hanging	
138	December 7, 1945	Henry Riley	17	17	0	Male	Black	Louisiana	Electrocution	
139	December 11, 1945	Robert Deegan	29	27	2	Male	White	New Jersey	Electrocution	
140	December 14, 1945	Monroe D. Neely	37	35	2	Male	Black	District of Columbia	Electrocution	
141	December 28, 1945	John Henry Fields	38	Unknown	Unknown	Male	Black	Maryland	Hanging	
142	December 28, 1945	William H. Turner	27	27	0	Male	White	West Virginia	Hanging	

== Demographics ==
Gender
Male	141	99%
Female	1	1%
Ethnicity
Black	81	57%
White	58	41%
Hispanic	2	1%
Native American	1	1%
State
U.S. military	27	19%
Georgia	19	13%
California	13	9%
North Carolina	9	6%
Ohio	7	5%
Florida	5	4%
Virginia	5	4%
Kentucky	4	3%
Louisiana	4	3%
Maryland	4	3%
Mississippi	4	3%
Texas	4	3%
Alabama	3	2%
Arizona	3	2%
Colorado	3	2%
New Jersey	3	2%
Oregon	3	2%
Arkansas	2	1%
Missouri	2	1%
Oklahoma	2	1%
South Carolina	2	1%
Tennessee	2	1%
West Virginia	2	1%
Connecticut	1	1%
Delaware	1	1%
District of Columbia	1	1%
Federal government	1	1%
Illinois	1	1%
Indiana	1	1%
Iowa	1	1%
Nebraska	1	1%
Utah	1	1%
Washington	1	1%
Method
Electrocution	71	50%
Gas chamber	34	24%
Hanging	33	23%
Firing squad	4	3%
Month
January	13	9%
February	4	3%
March	24	17%
April	11	8%
May	10	7%
June	10	7%
July	14	10%
August	19	13%
September	8	6%
October	8	6%
November	14	10%
December	7	5%
Age
Unknown	2	1%
10–19	6	4%
20–29	78	55%
30–39	40	28%
40–49	8	6%
50–59	5	4%
60–69	3	2%
Total	142	100%

== Executions in recent years ==
Number of executions
1946	129
1945	142
1944	122
Total	393

Preceded by 1944	List of people executed in the United States in 1945	Succeeded by 1946
