= Horst Günther =

German soldier and prisoner of war (1920–1944)

Horst Günther (September 23, 1920 – April 6, 1944) was a German World War II prisoner of war. An Afrika Korps Gefreiter, he was captured on May 9, 1943, in Tunisia and murdered at the Camp Aiken prisoner-of-war camp in South Carolina, by fellow prisoners.

Günther was suspected of collaborating with the American authorities and was strangled by two fellow prisoners-of-war, Erich Gauss and Rudolf Straub, who hanged his body from a tree in order to make it seem that he had killed himself. Gauss and Straub were both court-martialed for premeditated murder in June 1944. At their court-martial, Gauss and Straub both told the court that they did not believe their actions were morally wrong. Straub described them "as a complete, absolute German matter," and that he had no intention of doing "anything against the American State." Gauss described the murder as justified.

"I am no murderer. I merely fought for the honor of my Fatherland and for the respect as a soldier, and I believe that every decent German soldier would do likewise if fate had demanded it."

Gauss and Straub were both found guilty and sentenced to death. Gauss, 32, and Staub, 39, were hanged at the United States Disciplinary Barracks in Fort Leavenworth, Kansas on July 14, 1945. They were buried in the prison cemetery. Straub is alleged to have said just before his execution: "What I did was done as a German soldier under orders. If I had not done so, I would have been punished when I returned to Germany."

== See also ==
- List of people executed by the United States military
- List of people executed in the United States in 1945
- Johannes Kunze
- Werner Drechsler
