= Werner Drechsler =

German POW murdered by fellow POWs in Arizona (1917–1944)

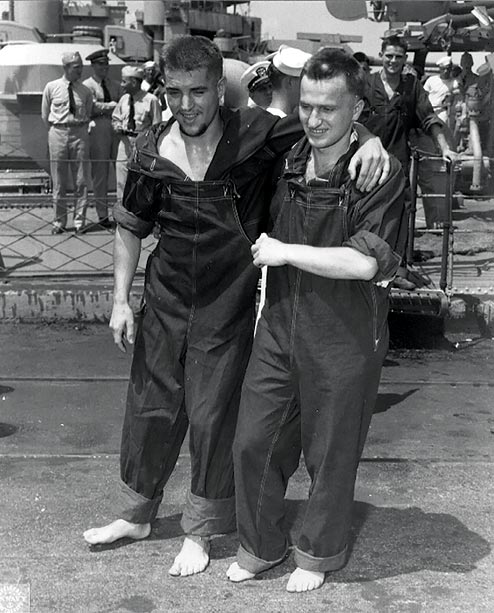
- Werner Drechsler (left), recovering from a bullet wound to his right knee, disembarking the USS Osmond Ingram on 20 June 1943 in Norfolk, Virginia
- Born: 17 January 1922; Mühlberg, Brandenburg, Germany
- Died: 12 March 1944 (aged 22); Papago Park, Arizona, United States
- Cause of death: Lynching

Werner Drechsler (17 January 1922 – 12 March 1944) was a German U-boat crewman during World War II. He served on U-118, which was sunk off the Azores in 1943. When he was taken prisoner, Drechsler, a conscript, enthusiastically cooperated with his captors. His father, a Social Democrat, had been sent to a Nazi concentration camp as a political prisoner.

Eventually, United States Navy intelligence officers recruited Drechsler as a spy and placed him in a prisoner of war (POW) camp near Fort Meade, Maryland with other U-boat sailors. After arrival, Drechsler worked undercover, befriending his fellow POWs in order to collect information regarding German submarine technology, operational procedures and tactics and any other intelligence which could be useful to the Allies.

On 12 March 1944 Drechsler was transferred to a different POW camp in Arizona which was filled mainly with other submariners of the Kriegsmarine. This transfer took place even though Drechsler was supposed to be kept segregated from other naval prisoners, particularly his former crewmates on the U-118, who were aware of Drechsler's spying activities. Drechsler's transfer to Arizona quickly had fatal results: some members of the U-118 were confined at the camp and they immediately recognised their former crewmate. Word of Drechsler's undercover activities spread rapidly through the camp, and a kangaroo court was convened while Drechsler was asleep. The other prisoners eventually decided it was necessary to kill Drechsler to ensure he could no longer spy upon them and also to act as a deterrent for any other POWs who might consider collaborating with the enemy. The next morning, Drechsler was found hanging in the shower room.

Unlike in many similar cases, Drechsler's murder was solved. Seven men, Otto Stengel of U-352, Heinrich Ludwig of U-199, and Helmut Fischer, Fritz Franke, Günter Külsen, Bernhard Reyak, and Rolf Wizuy, all of U-615, were tried by a general court-martial, found guilty of premeditated murder for the beating and hanging of Drechsler, and sentenced to death. They were all executed by hanging on 25 August 1945 at the United States Disciplinary Barracks in Fort Leavenworth, Kansas.

A review board had recommended that three other German POWs, Siegfried Elser of U-409, Friedrich Murza of U-487, and Heinz Karl Richter of U-352, who had been involved in the initial planning of the attack against Drechsler but chose not to participate, face charges as accessories before the fact to Drechsler's murder. However, they were never tried.

== See also ==
- List of people executed by the United States military
- List of people executed in the United States in 1945
- Horst Günther
- Johannes Kunze
