= European theatre of World War I =

Main theatre of operations during World War I

European theatre
- Part of World War I
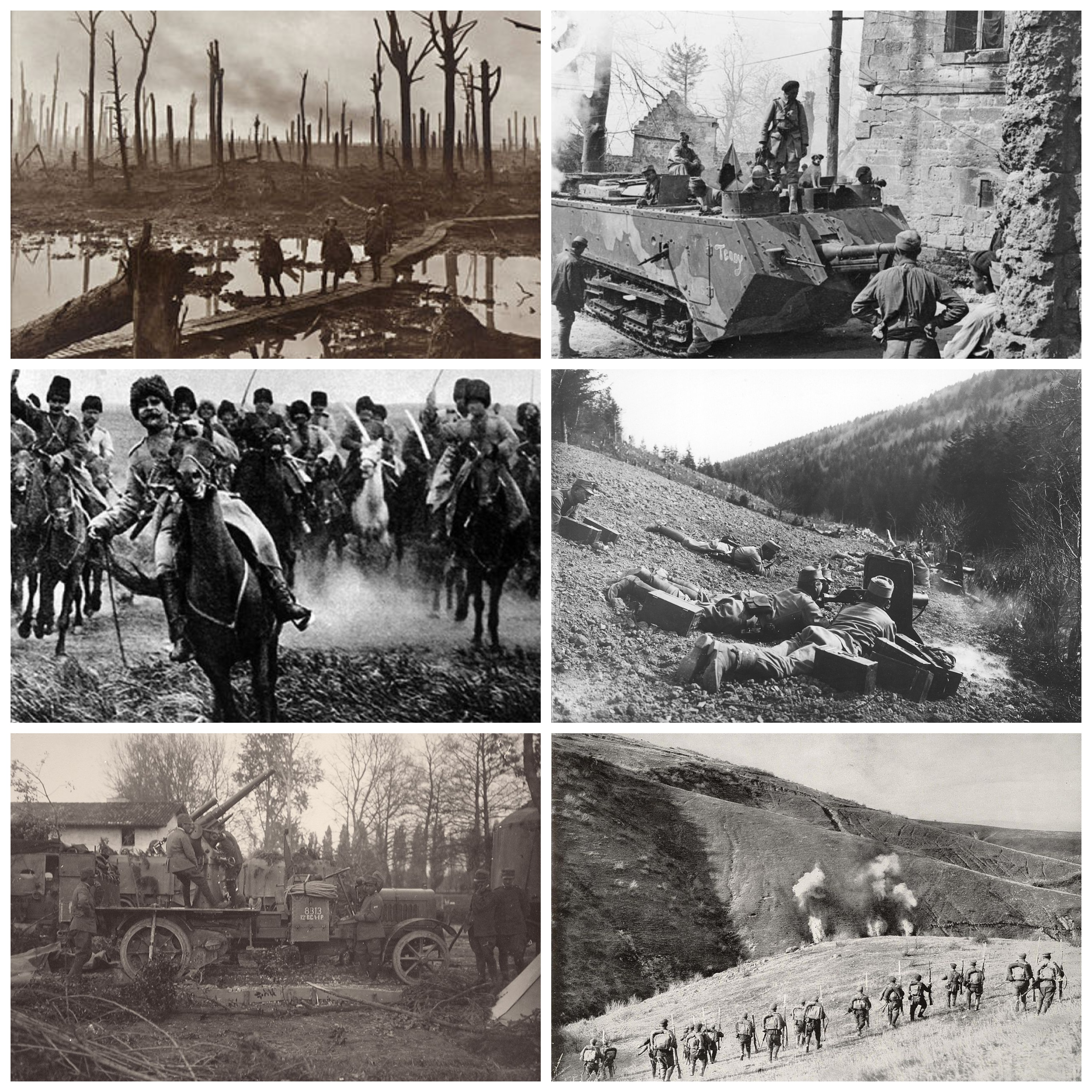
- From left to right, top to bottom: Australian gunners on a duckboard track in Château Wood, near Hooge, 1917; A French Saint-Chamond tank ("Teddy") with a 75 mm field gun, Condé-sur-Aisne, 1917; Russian cavalry during the Brusilov Offensive, 1916; Predominantly Polish troops of the Austro-Hungarian Army fire on Imperial Russian forces entrenched on the Pustki hill in the Carpathian Mountains, 1915; Italian 75mm anti-aircraft gun during the Eleventh Battle of the Isonzo, 1917; Bulgarian infantry during the Monastir offensive, 1916
Date	28 July 1914 – 11 November 1918/13 November 1918 (4 years, 3 months and 14 days) (if Armistice of Compiègne is seen as end of war) (4 years, 3 months and 16 days) (if Armistice of Belgrade is seen as end of war)
Location	Europe
Result	Allied victory: End of World War I; Treaty of Versailles

Belligerents
Allied Powers: France; United Kingdom and Empire: Canada; Australia; New Zealand; India; South Africa; Newfoundland; Russian Empire (until September 1917); Russian Republic (until November 1917); Italy; United States; Romania; Serbia; Montenegro; Belgium; Greece; Portugal; Siam; (Russian Soviet Federative Socialist Republic) Russian SFSR	Central Powers: Germany; Austria-Hungary; Bulgaria; Ottoman Empire

Commanders and leaders
(French Third Republic) Joseph Joffre; (French Third Republic) Ferdinand Foch; (French Third Republic) Robert Nivelle; (French Third Republic) Philippe Pétain; (United Kingdom of Great Britain and Ireland) John French; (United Kingdom of Great Britain and Ireland) Douglas Haig; Grand Duke Nikolai; Nicholas II; (Russia) Mikhail Alekseyev; (Russia) Aleksei Brusilov; (Russia) Lavr Kornilov †; (Russian Soviet Federative Socialist Republic) Vladimir Lenin; (Russian Soviet Federative Socialist Republic) Leon Trotsky; (Kingdom of Italy) Luigi Cadorna; (Kingdom of Italy) Armando Diaz; (United States) John J. Pershing; (Kingdom of Romania) Constantin Prezan; (Kingdom of Serbia) Petar Bojović; (Kingdom of Montenegro) Janko Vukotić; (Belgium) Albert I; (Kingdom of Greece) Panagiotis Danglis	(German Empire) Helmuth von Moltke; (German Empire) Erich von Falkenhayn; (German Empire) Paul von Hindenburg; (German Empire) Erich Ludendorff; (German Empire) Leopold of Bavaria; (Austria-Hungary) Archduke Friedrich; (Austria-Hungary) Conrad von Hötzendorf; (Austria-Hungary) A. A. von Straußenburg; (Tsardom of Bulgaria (1908–1946)) Nikola Zhekov; (Ottoman Empire) Enver Pasha

Casualties and losses
Military dead: 5,000,000	Military dead: 3,500,000
- 4,700,000 civilians killed or died of disease

The European theatre was the main theatre of operations during World War I and was where the war began and ended. During the four years of conflict, battle was joined by armies of unprecedented size, which were equipped with new mechanized technologies. The conflict left tens of millions dead or wounded.

The European theatre is divided into four main theatres of operations: the Western Front, the Eastern Front, the Italian Front, and the Balkans Front. Not all of Europe was involved in the war, nor did fighting take place throughout all of the major combatants’ territory. The United Kingdom was nearly untouched by the war. Most of France was unaffected, as was most of Germany and Italy.

Some large countries in Europe remained neutral for the entire war such as Sweden and Spain – the Great War passed them by without much impact. On the other hand, some countries were conquered (Serbia, Belgium, Romania). Other countries like Russia and the Ottoman Empire saw armies marching over much of their lands, with a great deal of resulting devastation.

Although the United States did join the war, due to Great Britain's control over the Atlantic Ocean, the only fighting for the U.S. Army was in Europe on the Western Front. The American army was transported by ship across the ocean so it could fight the Germans in France.

== Background ==
=== Balkan Wars ===
The Balkan Wars in 1912 and 1913 were two successive military conflicts in the Balkan Peninsula that led to World War I. In the First Balkan War, the Ottoman Empire's territories in Macedonia and Thrace were taken by the Balkan League of Tsardom of Bulgaria, Kingdom of Greece, Kingdom of Serbia, and Kingdom of Montenegro. The Ottomans lost most of their European territory except for East Thrace.

Bulgaria, Greece, and Serbia's dispute over the conquered territories resulted in the Second Balkan War. Bulgaria fought Greece, Serbia, and the Kingdom of Romania. The war ended with Serbia and Greece taking the northern and southern halves of Macedonia and Thrace, respectively. Serbia gained the region that is Kosovo in the modern day, Bulgaria was left a relatively small part of Thrace, and the Principality of Albania was formed on the western coast of the Balkans.

=== Assassination of Franz Ferdinand ===
On 28 June 1914, Franz Ferdinand, the archduke of Austria-Este, a house of the Austro-Hungarian dual monarchy, visited the city of Sarajevo in the Austro-Hungarian province of Bosnia and Herzegovina. The trip, meant for him to inspect the imperial army, was controversial as Serbian nationalists wanted Bosnia, and the visit took place on 28 June, which was considered a sad day for Serbians as that is when the Ottoman Empire won over Serbia at the Battle of Kosovo in 1389. The Battle of Kosovo is when Moravian Serbia was dissolved and Serbians were ruled by the Ottomans until the First Balkan War. During the trip, Ferdinand and his wife were traveling through the city in an open-topped car, when Gavrilo Princip, a Bosnian Serbian nationalist, fatally shot the archduke. Princip was a part of the Black Hand, a Serbian secret society in the 1910s, which advocated for Serbian independence from the Ottomans and Austria-Hungary.

The assassination gave Austria-Hungary the excuse it needed to invade rebellious Serbia. Serbia was supported by the powerful Russian Empire, a fellow Slavic nation, so Austria-Hungary wanted the assurance of military support from its ally, the German Empire, before it declared war on Serbia. Austria-Hungary did not want Russia to help Serbia, as Russia's allies, France and the United Kingdom, might join them as well, as so a German declaration of support might prevent Russia's involvement. On 5 July 1914, German leader Kaiser Wilhelm II gave a "blank cheque" to Austria-Hungary, declared his country's allyship.

On 23 July 1914, Austria-Hungary sent an ultimatum to Serbia with such harsh terms that it was impossible for Serbia to accept. Serbia, predicting Austria-Hungary was preparing to invade, asked Russia for their support. It was sent on the 23rd, by which point French president Raymond Poincaré and his premier René Viviani had gone to Russia for a state visit, and would be unable to comment on the ultimatum in time.

On 25 July, Serbia responded to the ultimatum, agreeing to most of its terms and offering the remaining disagreements to be subject to international arbitration. Austria-Hungary instead severed its diplomatic communications with Serbia and began partial mobilization. On the 28th, Willhelm II—who had been on a cruise in the North Sea since 6 July—found out about the ultimatum to Serbia, and advised the German Foreign Office to tell Austria-Hungary to aim for an occupation of the Serbian capital of Belgrade rather than a full invasion. The German Foreign Office had already told Austro-Hungarian monarch Franz Joseph I on the 27th that Germany authorized a full war.

=== Alliances and militaries in 1914 ===
A map of the main European alliances at the start of World War I, the Triple Entente and Triple Alliance. Countries in beige were on either side or neutral in the war.

At the start of World War I in Europe, there were two main sides, the Central Powers: Germany, Austria-Hungary, Bulgaria, and the Ottoman Empire; and the Allies: France, the U.K., Belgium, Portugal, Serbia, Montenegro, Romania, Greece, and the Russian Empire. The U.K. governed the British Empire and the British Commonwealth, which included Great Britain, Ireland, Canada, Australia, New Zealand, India, South Africa, Newfoundland, and the countries in the British West Indies, amongst others.

The alliance of France, Russia, and the U.K. was known as the "Triple Entente". From 1882 to 1915, Austria-Hungary, Germany, and Italy, were a part of the "Triple Alliance", but when Italy joined the war in 1915, it fought against the other two nations.

As of 4 August, 1914, the Central Powers had 115 million people, the Allies 265 million. The Central Powers produced more steel than the Allies, while the Allies had more army divisions available for mobilization, and more modern battleships. Great Britain had a volunteer army, meaning their troop numbers were small in comparison. Germany had 1.9 million soldiers, Austria-Hungary 450,000. Russia had 1.4 million soldiers, France 1.2 million, Serbia 190,000, Belgium 186,000, and Great Britain 120,000. 3 million soldiers fought for the British Empire and Commonwealth over the course of the war.

== 1914: Start of the war ==
World War I started on 28 July 1914 with Austria-Hungary's declaration of war against Serbia. Austria-Hungary hit Belgrade with artillery fire the next day. On the 30th, Russia ordered general mobilization. Germany still believed the conflict could be "localized" to the Balkans, and on 31 July sent Russia a 24-hour ultimatum, demanding they halt mobilization, and an 18-hour ultimatum to France demanding that they declare neutrality if Germany and Russia went to the war with each other. Both ultimatums were ignored.

On 1 August, Germany and France ordered general mobilization, and Germany declared war on Russia. On 2 August, German troops entered Luxembourg, and the next day, Germany declared war on France. On the night of the 3rd, Germany invaded Belgium; the U.K., not beholden to its allies Serbia, France, or Russia in a war, did previously make a deal to defend Belgium if it was attacked. On 5 August, Austria-Hungary declared war against Russia; on the 6th, Serbia against Germany; on the 7th, Montenegro against Austria-Hungary; on the 10th, France against Austria-Hungary; on the 12th, the U.K. against Austria-Hungary and Montenegro against Germany; on the 23rd, the Empire of Japan against Germany; on the 25th, Austria-Hungary against Japan, and on the 28th, Austria-Hungary declared war on Belgium. Romania and Italy, both allied with the Central Powers, decided not to go to war. Britannica writes:

The outbreak of war in August 1914 was generally greeted with confidence and jubilation by the peoples of Europe, among whom it inspired a wave of patriotic feeling and celebration. Few people imagined how long or how disastrous a war between the great nations of Europe could be, and most believed that their country’s side would be victorious within a matter of months.

During the unstable European peace following Franco-Prussian War (1870—1871), the machine gun and the rapid-fire field artillery gun had been developed. At the start of the war, some major powers did not know that the development of such weapons ruined the effectiveness of frontal infantry or cavalry charges, and that trench warfare was a natural result of this. The failure of such attacks was previously discovered during the Second Boer War (1899—1902) and Russo-Japanese War (1904—1905), but French military doctrine believed that they could survive the charges through "wills, spirit, and courage". In comparison, Germans opted for flanking attacks deep into enemy positions.

The Battle of the Frontiers was in France and Belgium from 4 to 6 August. The Battle of Tannenberg was in Germany from 26 to 30 August. The First Battle of the Marne was in France from 6 to 12 September. The First Battle of Ypres was in Belgium from 19 October to 22 November. The Christmas truce was from 24 to 25 December.

== 1915–1917: Stalemate ==
The Gallipoli campaign near the Ottoman capital of Constantinople was from 16 February 1915 to 9 January 1916. The Second Battle of Ypres was from 22 April to 25 May 1915. The Treaty of London was made on 26 April. On 7 May 1915, the British ocean liner RMS Lusitania was sunk by a German u-boat over the Atlantic Ocean. The ship contained American passengers and its sinking contributed to the United States' later entry into the war on the side of the allies. The Battles of the Isonzo in Italy and modern Slovenia, then a part of Austria-Hungary, were from 23 June 1915 to 24 October 1917. The Battle of Lone Pine, a part of the Gallipoli campaign, was from 6 to 10 August 1915.

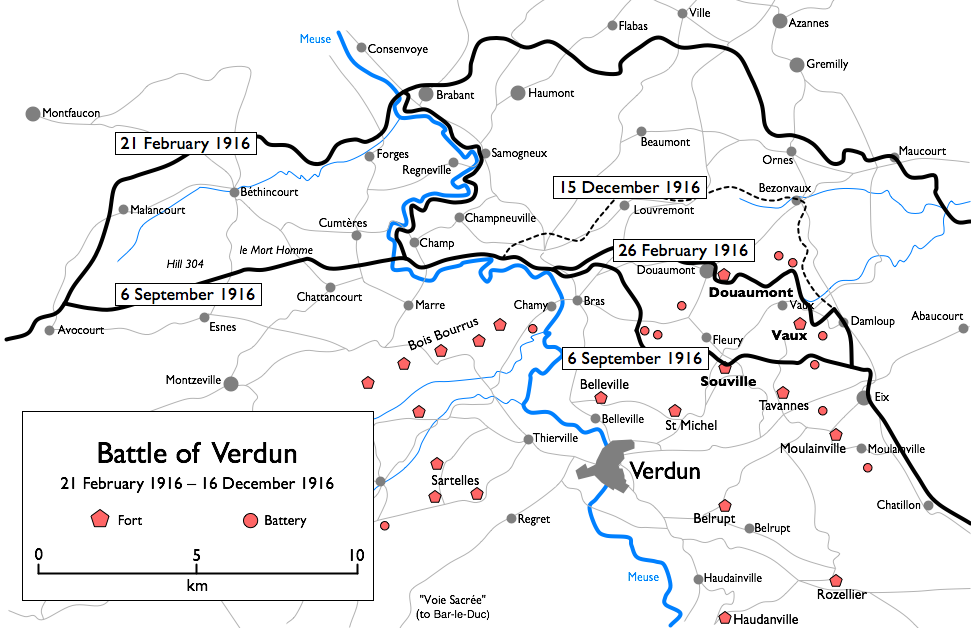
A map of the 1916 Battle of Verdun in France

The Battle of Verdun in France was from 21 February to 18 December 1916. The French passenger steamer SS Sussex was sunk by u-boats while crossing the British Channel on 24 March 1916; the sinking inspired the German military to take the Sussex pledge to not sink Allied ship containing passengers in certain areas, which was controversial among German military leaders. The Battle of Jutland, near Denmark in the North Sea, was from 31 May to 1 June. The Brusilov offensive in Galicia was from 4 June to 10 August. The First Battle of the Somme in France was from 1 July to 13 November.

On 16 January 1917, Germany sent the Zimmermann telegram to Mexico, asking the Mexican government to ally with Germany and Japan in case the U.S. declared war on Germany. The discovery of the telegram by the Allies quickened the U.S.' entry into the war.

The Russian Revolution started on 8 March 1917, with the February Revolution (the discrepancy in months is due to Russian Old Style formatting). The Duma, the Russian legislative body, formed the Provisional Government to lead the country. It was composed almost entirely of liberal ministers, and was internationally recognized. However, it did not address the underlying inequality that created the February Revolution.

The Battle of Messines (1917) in Belgium was from 7 to 14 June 1917.

The Kerensky offensive in Galicia, planned by Russian minister of war Aleksandr Kerensky, was in early July. Britannica writes: "The [Kerensky offensive] not only demonstrated the degree to which the Russian army had disintegrated, but also the extent of the Provisional Government’s failure to interpret and respond adequately to popular revolutionary sentiment. Temporarily, it also had the effect of strengthening moderate and conservative elements in [Russia]."

The Battle of Passchendale in Belgium was from 31 July to 6 November. The Battle of Caporetto in Austria-Hungary was from 24 October to 19 December. The Battle of Cambrai (1917) in France was from 20 November to 8 December; it had the "first large-scale, effective use of tanks in warfare".

== 1917–1918: End of the war ==
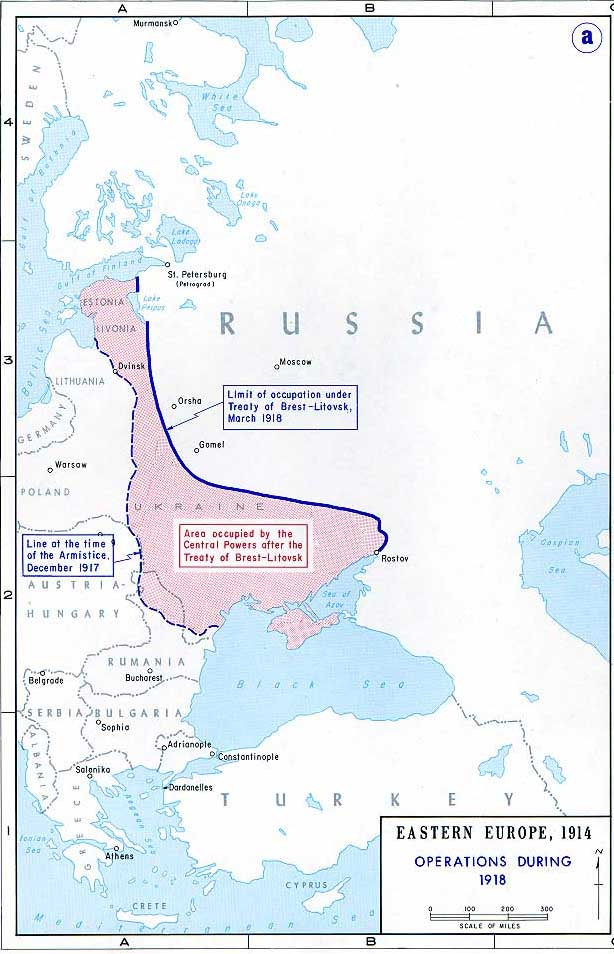
Territorial changes after the Treaty of Brest Litovsk between the Russian SFSR and the Central Powers

In the October Revolution in Russia from 6 to 7 November 1917, the left-wing Bolsheviks led by Vladimir Lenin overthrew the Provisional Government, establishing the communist Russian Soviet Federative Socialist Republic (Russian SFSR). The Treaty of Brest Litovsk between the Russian SFSR and the Central Powers was signed in early 1918, making peace between the two and ending Russia's involvement in World War I. The Russian Civil War started in 1918 between the Bolshevik Red Army and the right-leaning Whites.

The Battle of Belleau Wood in France was from 1 to 26 June. The Allied success greatly boosted their morale. The Battle of Amiens in France was from 8 to 11 August. The Battle of Saint-Mihiel in France was from 12 to 19 September. The Battle of Cambrai (1918) was from 27 September to 11 October. The Second Battle of Mons in Belgium was in November. World War I ended on 11 November 1918 with an Allied victory.

== Aftermath ==
The 1919 Treaty of Versailles, deliberated by the Allied powers, established the balance of power in postwar Europe. The punishment imposed Germany, who was declared to have been responsible for the war, led to the rise of Nazi Germany and the start of World War II. The Russian Civil War was won by the Red Army, and the Bolsheviks established the Soviet Union in 1922. The Ottoman Empire dissolved in 1922.

== See also ==
- Finnish Civil War
