= Lists of people executed in the United States =

This is a list of lists of people executed in the United States.

== 1900–1972 ==
The following are lists of people executed in the United States between 1900–1972. Capital punishment in the United States was suspended for four years following Furman v. Georgia.

=== By state ===
- List of people executed in Alabama (pre-1972)
- List of people executed in Arizona (pre-1972)
- List of people executed in Arkansas (pre-1972)
- List of people executed in Florida (pre-1972)
- List of people executed in Delaware (pre-1972)
- List of people executed in Georgia (U.S. state) (pre-1972)
- List of people executed in Hawaii (Note: Abolished in 1957, two years before US statehood)
- List of people executed in Indiana (pre-1972)
- List of people executed in Iowa (Note: Abolished in 1965)
- List of people executed in Kansas (Note: No executions since 1965)
- List of people executed in Kentucky (pre-1972)
- List of people executed in Louisiana (pre-1972)
- List of people executed in Maine (Note: Abolished in 1887)
- List of people executed in Michigan (Note: Abolished in 1847)
- List of people executed in Minnesota (Note: Abolished in 1911)
- List of people executed in Mississippi (pre-1972)
- List of people executed in Missouri (pre-1972)
- List of people executed in Montana (pre-1972)
- List of people executed in Nebraska (pre-1972)
- List of people executed in North Carolina (pre-1972)
- List of people executed in Oklahoma (pre-1972)
- List of people executed in Oregon (pre-1972)
- List of people executed in Rhode Island (Note: Abolished in 1852)
- List of people executed in South Carolina (pre-1972)
- List of people executed in South Dakota (pre-1972)
- List of people executed in Tennessee (pre-1972)
- Lists of people executed in Texas
- List of people executed in Vermont (Note: Abolished in 1972)
- List of people executed in Virginia (pre-1972)
- List of people executed in Washington (pre-1972)
- List of people executed in West Virginia (Note: Abolished in 1965)
- List of people executed in Wisconsin (Note: Abolished in 1853)

=== By year ===
- 1900
- 1901
- 1902
- 1903
- 1904
- 1905
- 1906
- 1907
- 1908
- 1909
- 1910
- 1911
- 1912
- 1913
- 1914
- 1915
- 1916
- 1917
- 1918
- 1919
- 1920
- 1921
- 1922
- 1923
- 1924
- 1925
- 1926
- 1927
- 1928
- 1929
- 1930
- 1931
- 1932
- 1933
- 1934
- 1935
- 1936
- 1937
- 1938
- 1939
- 1940
- 1941
- 1942
- 1943
- 1944
- 1945
- 1946
- 1947
- 1948
- 1949
- 1950
- 1951
- 1952
- 1953
- 1954
- 1955
- 1956
- 1957
- 1958
- 1959
- 1960
- 1961
- 1962
- 1963
- 1964
- 1965–1972

== Since 1976 ==
The following are lists of people executed in the United States since 1976.

=== By state and U.S. capital ===
- List of people executed in Alabama
- List of people executed in Arizona
- List of people executed in Arkansas
- List of people executed in California
- List of people executed in Colorado
- List of people executed in Connecticut
- List of people executed in Delaware
- List of people executed by the District of Columbia
- List of people executed in Florida
- List of people executed in Georgia
- List of people executed in Idaho
- List of people executed in Illinois
- List of people executed in Indiana
- List of people executed in Iowa
- List of people executed in Kansas
- List of people executed in Kentucky
- List of people executed in Louisiana
- List of people executed in Maine
- List of people executed in Maryland
- List of people executed in Massachusetts
- List of people executed in Michigan
- List of people executed in Minnesota
- List of people executed in Mississippi
- List of people executed in Missouri
- List of people executed in Montana
- List of people executed in Nebraska
- List of people executed in Nevada
- List of people executed in New Hampshire
- List of people executed in New Jersey
- List of people executed in New Mexico
- List of people executed in New York
- List of people executed in North Carolina
- List of people executed in North Dakota
- List of people executed in Ohio
- List of people executed in Oklahoma
- List of people executed in Oregon
- List of people executed in Pennsylvania
- List of people executed in Rhode Island
- List of people executed in South Carolina
- List of people executed in South Dakota
- List of people executed in Tennessee
- Lists of people executed in Texas
- List of people executed in Utah
- List of people executed in Vermont
- List of people executed in Virginia
- List of people executed in Washington
- List of people executed in West Virginia
- List of people executed in Wisconsin
- List of people executed in Wyoming

=== By year ===
- 1976–1983
- 1984
- 1985
- 1986
- 1987
- 1988
- 1989
- 1990
- 1991
- 1992
- 1993
- 1994
- 1995
- 1996
- 1997
- 1998
- 1999
- 2000
- 2001
- 2002
- 2003
- 2004
- 2005
- 2006
- 2007
- 2008
- 2009
- 2010
- 2011
- 2012
- 2013
- 2014
- 2015
- 2016
- 2017
- 2018
- 2019
- 2020
- 2021
- 2022
- 2023
- 2024
- 2025
- 2026

== See also ==
- List of people scheduled to be executed in the United States
- List of people executed by the United States federal government
- List of people executed by the United States military
- List of most recent executions by jurisdiction § United States
- List of juveniles executed in the United States since 1976
- List of women executed in the United States since 1976
- List of white defendants executed for killing a black victim
