= List of people executed in the United States in 1911 =

One hundred and six people, all male, were executed in the United States in 1911, sixty-seven by hanging, and thirty-nine by electrocution.

== List of people executed in the United States in 1911 ==
No.	Date of execution	Name	Age of person			Gender	Ethnicity	State	Method	Ref.
No.	Date of execution	Name	At execution	At offense	Age difference	Gender	Ethnicity	State	Method	Ref.
1	January 3, 1911	Gyula Toft	22	Unknown	Unknown	Male	White	New Jersey	Electrocution	
2	January 3, 1911	Samuel Austin	30	29	1	Male	Black	New York	Electrocution	
3	January 6, 1911	Dominick Ferrera	Unknown	Unknown	Unknown	Male	White	New York	Electrocution	
4	January 6, 1911	Vincent Leonardo	Unknown	Unknown	Unknown	Male	White	New York	Electrocution	
5	January 7, 1911	Milton Kiser	Unknown	Unknown	Unknown	Male	Black	South Carolina	Hanging	
6	January 7, 1911	Richard Biggs	29	Unknown	Unknown	Male	Black	Virginia	Electrocution	
7	January 13, 1911	Westley Rooks	Unknown	Unknown	Unknown	Male	White	Louisiana	Hanging	
8	January 13, 1911	Claude Thomas	Unknown	Unknown	Unknown	Male	White	Louisiana	Hanging	
9	January 27, 1911	James Green	Unknown	Unknown	1	Male	Black	Florida	Hanging	
10	February 1, 1911	Samuel Ford	Unknown	Unknown	2	Male	Black	New York	Electrocution	
11	February 8, 1911	Michael Leahy	33	32	1	Male	White	California	Hanging	
12	February 8, 1911	Calvin Johnston	Unknown	Unknown	0	Male	Black	Georgia	Hanging	
13	February 10, 1911	Phillip Mills	35	34	1	Male	Black	North Carolina	Electrocution	
14	February 14, 1911	Espridon Lahom	22	Unknown	Unknown	Male	Asian	Hawaii Territory	Hanging	
15	February 15, 1911	Nathan Montague	28	28	0	Male	Black	North Carolina	Electrocution	
16	February 17, 1911	Frank Stevenson	27	23	4	Male	Black	West Virginia	Hanging	
17	February 23, 1911	Alton V. Hover	25	23	2	Male	White	Pennsylvania	Hanging	
18	February 23, 1911	Antonio Pacito	24	22	2	Male	White	Pennsylvania	Hanging	
19	February 24, 1911	James Bethel Allison	47	46	1	Male	White	North Carolina	Electrocution	
20	March 7, 1911	Andrei Ipsen	19	18	1	Male	White	Massachusetts	Electrocution	
21	March 7, 1911	Wassili Ivankowski	22	21	1	Male	White	Massachusetts	Electrocution	
22	March 10, 1911	Willie Fletcher	Unknown	Unknown	1	Male	Black	Louisiana	Hanging	
23	March 10, 1911	Jesse Cook	22	Unknown	Unknown	Male	White	West Virginia	Hanging	
24	March 15, 1911	John Sears	33	32	1	Male	Black	New Jersey	Electrocution	
25	March 15, 1911	Tolbert Fanning Byram	51	Unknown	Unknown	Male	White	Tennessee	Hanging	
26	March 17, 1911	William Furbish	28	27	1	Male	Black	West Virginia	Hanging	
27	March 21, 1911	Steve Rusic	Unknown	Unknown	1	Male	White	Pennsylvania	Hanging	
28	March 28, 1911	George A. Greene	35	31	4	Male	White	Pennsylvania	Hanging	
29	March 30, 1911	Joseph Christock	Unknown	Unknown	1	Male	White	Pennsylvania	Hanging	
30	March 31, 1911	Frank Henson	31	30	1	Male	Black	Oklahoma	Hanging	
31	April 14, 1911	Edward Weaver	Unknown	Unknown	1	Male	Black	Georgia	Hanging	
32	April 17, 1911	Robert Francis Wood	47	44	3	Male	White	New York	Electrocution	
33	April 18, 1911	Christopher Buntin	34	Unknown	Unknown	Male	Black	New Jersey	Electrocution	
34	April 21, 1911	Thomas Pearce	Unknown	Unknown	1	Male	White	Arkansas	Hanging	
35	April 21, 1911	Pleas Veaudoo	Unknown	Unknown	1	Male	Black	Arkansas	Hanging	
36	April 21, 1911	Eugene Besancon	Unknown	Unknown	1	Male	White	Louisiana	Hanging	
37	April 21, 1911	Francois Henri Rodin	55	54	1	Male	White	Louisiana	Hanging	
38	April 21, 1911	Frederick William Jahns	63	61	2	Male	White	Washington	Hanging	
39	April 25, 1911	Bert Delige	27	27	0	Male	Black	Pennsylvania	Hanging	
40	May 3, 1911	Joseph Nesce	44	43	1	Male	White	New York	Electrocution	
41	May 5, 1911	Lewis West	24	24	0	Male	Black	North Carolina	Electrocution	
42	May 11, 1911	Frank Lee	36	33	3	Male	Black	Pennsylvania	Hanging	
43	May 12, 1911	Norman Lewis	22	21	1	Male	Black	North Carolina	Electrocution	
44	May 19, 1911	Thomas Johnson	39	37	2	Male	Black	Nebraska	Hanging	
45	May 23, 1911	Frank E. Heideman	27	26	1	Male	White	New Jersey	Electrocution	
46	May 23, 1911	John W. Tyrie	48	47	1	Male	Black	Pennsylvania	Hanging	
47	May 25, 1911	Roger Warren	24	23	1	Male	Black	Kentucky	Hanging	
48	May 26, 1911	John Bird	30	Unknown	Unknown	Male	Black	Louisiana	Hanging	
49	May 26, 1911	Joseph Daniels	Unknown	Unknown	Unknown	Male	Black	Louisiana	Hanging	
50	May 26, 1911	Gary Gist	19	19	0	Male	Black	South Carolina	Hanging	
51	June 1, 1911	Vincent Voychek	34	32	2	Male	White	Pennsylvania	Hanging	
52	June 2, 1911	Bill Walker	Unknown	Unknown	1	Male	Black	Alabama	Hanging	
53	June 2, 1911	Alex Holloman	24	Unknown	Unknown	Male	Black	Virginia	Electrocution	
54	June 9, 1911	Harry Paschal	Unknown	Unknown	1	Male	Black	Georgia	Hanging	
55	June 9, 1911	John Jarrett Withrow Jr.	23	22	1	Male	White	Georgia	Hanging	
56	June 10, 1911	Ed Jones	Unknown	Unknown	1	Male	Black	Georgia	Hanging	
57	June 12, 1911	Thomas Barnes	38	37	1	Male	White	New York	Electrocution	
58	June 12, 1911	Frederick Gebhardt	39	37	2	Male	White	New York	Electrocution	
59	June 16, 1911	Juan Magana	24	24	0	Male	Hispanic	California	Hanging	
60	June 16, 1911	Sam Swatson	26	26	0	Male	Black	Georgia	Hanging	
61	June 26, 1911	Joseph Nacco	33	31	2	Male	White	New York	Electrocution	
62	July 7, 1911	Domingo Franco	44	44	0	Male	Hispanic	Arizona Territory	Hanging	
63	July 7, 1911	Daniel Duncan	24	23	1	Male	Black	South Carolina	Hanging	
64	July 8, 1911	James Buckner	18	17	1	Male	Black	Kentucky	Electrocution	
65	July 14, 1911	Reese W. Roberts	32	31	1	Male	Black	Delaware	Hanging	
66	July 14, 1911	William Walker	Unknown	Unknown	2	Male	Black	Florida	Hanging	
67	July 16, 1911	Alexander King	46	46	0	Male	Black	Illinois	Hanging	
68	July 17, 1911	Giuseppe Serimarco	27	25	2	Male	White	New York	Electrocution	
69	July 28, 1911	Alejandro Gallego	35	Unknown	Unknown	Male	Hispanic	Arizona Territory	Hanging	
70	July 28, 1911	Cletus Clarence Willaman	30	28	2	Male	White	Ohio	Electrocution	
71	July 31, 1911	Charles L. Green	40	39	1	Male	White	New York	Electrocution	
72	August 4, 1911	Demetry Treschenko	52	50	2	Male	White	California	Hanging	
73	August 5, 1911	Reuben Shady "Sandy" Penman	35	34	1	Male	Black	Kentucky	Electrocution	
74	August 11, 1911	Tim Williams	Unknown	Unknown	0	Male	Black	Louisiana	Hanging	
75	August 16, 1911	Patrick Columbus Casey	50	48	2	Male	White	Nevada	Hanging	
76	August 22, 1911	Oliver Locks	43	42	1	Male	Black	Kentucky	Electrocution	
77	August 30, 1911	Bell Gage	Unknown	Unknown	Unknown	Male	Black	Mississippi	Hanging	
78	August 31, 1911	William P. Burke	52	50	2	Male	White	Pennsylvania	Hanging	
79	September 1, 1911	William Henry Rouse	49	48	1	Male	White	Georgia	Hanging	
80	September 26, 1911	Emmett Jeremiah Harris	23	22	1	Male	Black	Pennsylvania	Hanging	
81	September 28, 1911	Matthew Kelly	37	36	1	Male	Black	Kentucky	Electrocution	
82	October 26, 1911	Albert Matthews	26	26	0	Male	Black	Georgia	Hanging	
83	October 27, 1911	Norvell Marshall Jr.	31	31	0	Male	Black	North Carolina	Electrocution	
84	October 27, 1911	Charles E. Justice	43	42	1	Male	White	Ohio	Electrocution	
85	November 3, 1911	Stephen Scott	32	Unknown	Unknown	Male	Black	Ohio	Electrocution	
86	November 11, 1911	Andrew Davis	Unknown	Unknown	Unknown	Male	Black	Georgia	Hanging	
87	November 17, 1911	Robert Cook	Unknown	Unknown	Unknown	Male	Black	Tennessee	Hanging	
88	November 20, 1911	Pietro Falletta	33	31	2	Male	White	New York	Electrocution	
89	November 20, 1911	Frank Schermerhorn	24	22	2	Male	White	New York	Electrocution	
90	November 20, 1911	Bertram L. Brown	22	21	1	Male	Black	New York	Electrocution	
91	November 24, 1911	Ross French	21	21	0	Male	Native American	North Carolina	Electrocution	
92	November 24, 1911	Henry Clay Beattie Jr.	27	26	1	Male	White	Virginia	Electrocution	
93	November 27, 1911	J.A. O'Berry	26	Unknown	Unknown	Male	White	Georgia	Hanging	
94	December 1, 1911	Will McCoy	Unknown	Unknown	Unknown	Male	Black	Florida	Hanging	
95	December 1, 1911	Edgar Youmans	Unknown	Unknown	Unknown	Male	Black	Florida	Hanging	
96	December 5, 1911	T.W. Walker	Unknown	Unknown	0	Male	Black	Georgia	Hanging	
97	December 8, 1911	Thomas Jackson	Unknown	Unknown	2	Male	Black	Georgia	Hanging	
98	December 14, 1911	William Turner	Unknown	Unknown	0	Male	Black	Georgia	Hanging	
99	December 15, 1911	Henry Hill	Unknown	Unknown	Unknown	Male	Black	Arkansas	Hanging	
100	December 15, 1911	Ned Ringer	Unknown	Unknown	Unknown	Male	Black	Arkansas	Hanging	
101	December 15, 1911	Jesse Smith	Unknown	Unknown	Unknown	Male	Black	Arkansas	Hanging	
102	December 15, 1911	Thomas Davis	26	Unknown	Unknown	Male	Black	Ohio	Electrocution	
103	December 20, 1911	Wade Hood	44	Unknown	Unknown	Male	Black	South Carolina	Hanging	
104	December 20, 1911	Henry Kee	42	42	0	Male	Black	South Carolina	Hanging	
105	December 22, 1911	Henry Winston	Unknown	Unknown	Unknown	Male	Black	Alabama	Hanging	
106	December 29, 1911	Lewis McLean Sandlin	42	42	0	Male	White	North Carolina	Electrocution	

== Demographics ==
Gender
Male	106	100%
Female	0	0%
Ethnicity
Black	60	57%
White	41	39%
Hispanic	3	3%
Asian	1	1%
Native American	1	1%
State
New York	14	13%
Georgia	13	12%
Pennsylvania	11	10%
Louisiana	8	8%
North Carolina	8	8%
Arkansas	5	5%
Kentucky	5	5%
South Carolina	5	5%
Florida	4	4%
New Jersey	4	4%
Ohio	4	4%
California	3	3%
Virginia	3	3%
West Virginia	3	3%
Alabama	2	2%
Arizona Territory	2	2%
Massachusetts	2	2%
Tennessee	2	2%
Delaware	1	1%
Hawaii Territory	1	1%
Illinois	1	1%
Mississippi	1	1%
Nebraska	1	1%
Nevada	1	1%
Oklahoma	1	1%
Washington	1	1%
Method
Hanging	67	63%
Electrocution	39	37%
Month
January	9	8%
February	10	9%
March	11	10%
April	9	8%
May	11	10%
June	11	10%
July	10	9%
August	7	7%
September	3	3%
October	3	3%
November	9	8%
December	13	12%
Age
Unknown	33	31%
10–19	3	3%
20–29	29	27%
30–39	22	21%
40–49	13	12%
50–59	5	5%
60–69	1	1%
Total	106	100%

== Executions in recent years ==
Number of executions
1912	161
1911	106
1910	127
Total	394

Preceded by 1910	List of people executed in the United States in 1911	Succeeded by 1912
