= List of people executed in the United States in 1910 =

One hundred and twenty-seven people, all male, were executed in the United States in 1910, ninety by hanging, and thirty-seven by electrocution.

== List of people executed in the United States in 1910 ==
No.	Date of execution	Name	Age of person			Gender	Ethnicity	State	Method	Ref.
No.	Date of execution	Name	At execution	At offense	Age difference	Gender	Ethnicity	State	Method	Ref.
1	January 1, 1910	Henry Crosby	Unknown	Unknown	Unknown	Male	White	Arkansas	Hanging	
2	January 3, 1910	John Barbuto	24	23	1	Male	White	New York	Electrocution	
3	January 3, 1910	William Morse	25	23	2	Male	Black	New York	Electrocution	
4	January 4, 1910	John Chogwaski	29	28	1	Male	White	Pennsylvania	Hanging	
5	January 5, 1910	Jose Lopez	19	Unknown	Unknown	Male	Hispanic	Arizona Territory	Hanging	
6	January 5, 1910	Frank Jackson	41	40	1	Male	Black	New York	Electrocution	
7	January 7, 1910	Earl Thompson	18	18	0	Male	Black	Kentucky	Hanging	
8	January 14, 1910	R.H. Owen	Unknown	Unknown	Unknown	Male	White	Florida	Hanging	
9	January 14, 1910	Carl Bortuna	27	26	1	Male	White	Louisiana	Hanging	
10	January 14, 1910	Thurman Spinher	18	Unknown	Unknown	Male	Black	Virginia	Electrocution	
11	January 19, 1910	Charles Mullins	Unknown	Unknown	Unknown	Male	Black	Arkansas	Hanging	
12	January 19, 1910	Will Mullins	Unknown	Unknown	Unknown	Male	Black	Arkansas	Hanging	
13	January 19, 1910	Harry Zeek Rife	38	38	0	Male	White	Ohio	Electrocution	
14	January 25, 1910	George Ves	32	Unknown	Unknown	Male	White	New Jersey	Electrocution	
15	January 25, 1910	W.P. Parker	25	Unknown	Unknown	Male	Black	Virginia	Electrocution	
16	January 27, 1910	Alfred Wenk	22	19	3	Male	White	Pennsylvania	Hanging	
17	January 28, 1910	William Goins	38	Unknown	Unknown	Male	Black	Virginia	Electrocution	
18	February 3, 1910	Saburo Kanagawa	24	Unknown	Unknown	Male	Asian	Hawaii Territory	Hanging	
19	February 4, 1910	Ed Howard	Unknown	Unknown	1	Male	Black	Alabama	Hanging	
20	February 5, 1910	John Kilpatrick	26	25	1	Male	Black	Ohio	Electrocution	
21	February 8, 1910	George Reynolds	26	26	0	Male	Black	Missouri	Hanging	
22	February 8, 1910	John Williams	Unknown	Unknown	0	Male	Black	Missouri	Hanging	
23	February 9, 1910	John Zawedzianczek	28	26	2	Male	White	Connecticut	Hanging	
24	February 10, 1910	George N. Schaeffer	25	23	2	Male	White	Pennsylvania	Hanging	
25	February 11, 1910	Armas Woods	Unknown	Unknown	2	Male	Black	Louisiana	Hanging	
26	February 11, 1910	Henry Betts	Unknown	Unknown	0	Male	Black	Mississippi	Hanging	
27	February 11, 1910	Willie Blake	23	Unknown	Unknown	Male	Black	Virginia	Electrocution	
28	February 11, 1910	William Howard Little	37	37	0	Male	White	Virginia	Electrocution	
29	February 18, 1910	Willard Webb	Unknown	Unknown	1	Male	Black	Georgia	Hanging	
30	February 18, 1910	Willis Clark	Unknown	Unknown	0	Male	Black	Illinois	Hanging	
31	February 23, 1910	Carlo Giro	35	34	1	Male	White	New York	Electrocution	
32	February 25, 1910	Josh Mitchell	Unknown	Unknown	Unknown	Male	Black	Louisiana	Hanging	
33	February 26, 1910	Gus Thomas	24	Unknown	Unknown	Male	Black	Texas	Hanging	
34	February 26, 1910	Sam Washington	34	Unknown	Unknown	Male	Black	Texas	Hanging	
35	February 28, 1910	Charles Bowser	38	37	1	Male	Black	New York	Electrocution	
36	March 4, 1910	Roland Flowers	40	40	0	Male	Black	Florida	Hanging	
37	March 11, 1910	Walter Hogue	22	20	2	Male	White	Arkansas	Hanging	
38	March 11, 1910	Charles Davis	27	26	1	Male	Black	Ohio	Electrocution	
39	March 12, 1910	Henry Spivey	30	28	2	Male	Black	North Carolina	Hanging	
40	March 14, 1910	John Smyth	32	31	1	Male	White	New York	Electrocution	
41	March 18, 1910	Walter Morrison	37	36	1	Male	Black	North Carolina	Electrocution	
42	March 25, 1910	Jim Powell	22	20	2	Male	Black	Alabama	Hanging	
43	March 25, 1910	Joe Rodgers	Unknown	Unknown	2	Male	Black	Alabama	Hanging	
44	April 8, 1910	Alf Hunter	31	29	2	Male	Black	Oklahoma	Hanging	
45	April 14, 1910	Shendore Fencez	29	28	1	Male	White	Pennsylvania	Hanging	
46	April 15, 1910	George E. Burge	33	32	1	Male	White	Georgia	Hanging	
47	April 15, 1910	John Black	Unknown	Unknown	1	Male	Black	Oklahoma	Hanging	
48	April 18, 1910	Earl B. Hill	21	19	2	Male	White	New York	Electrocution	
49	April 19, 1910	Julian Lamkin	Unknown	Unknown	1	Male	Black	Georgia	Hanging	
50	April 25, 1910	Elijah Rouse	28	Unknown	Unknown	Male	Black	Virginia	Electrocution	
51	May 6, 1910	Henry Harding	62	61	1	Male	White	Arkansas	Hanging	
52	May 6, 1910	Irving Hanchett	14	14	0	Male	White	Florida	Hanging	
53	May 7, 1910	John Suple	Unknown	Unknown	2	Male	Black	Georgia	Hanging	
54	May 9, 1910	Gilbert Coleman	26	24	2	Male	Black	New York	Electrocution	
55	May 13, 1910	Henry Patterson	Unknown	Unknown	1	Male	Black	Georgia	Hanging	
56	May 13, 1910	Richard Quinn	31	30	1	Male	White	Washington	Hanging	
57	May 14, 1910	Julius R. "Bubber" Robertson	28	26	2	Male	Black	Texas	Hanging	
58	May 19, 1910	Floyd Frazier	24	21	3	Male	White	Kentucky	Hanging	
59	May 20, 1910	Howard Harris	Unknown	Unknown	Unknown	Male	Black	Georgia	Hanging	
60	May 26, 1910	John Adkins	45	45	0	Male	White	Arkansas	Hanging	
61	June 3, 1910	G.R. Miller	32	31	1	Male	White	Texas	Hanging	
62	June 3, 1910	Henry Smith	45	44	1	Male	Black	Virginia	Electrocution	
63	June 9, 1910	Freeman Harrell	21	Unknown	Unknown	Male	Black	Alabama	Hanging	
64	June 10, 1910	Robert Davis	24	Unknown	Unknown	Male	Black	Missouri	Hanging	
65	June 10, 1910	George Albert Jackson	19	18	1	Male	Black	Missouri	Hanging	
66	June 10, 1910	Thomas Noel	25	24	1	Male	Black	Virginia	Electrocution	
67	June 16, 1910	Joe McDaniels	Unknown	Unknown	Unknown	Male	Black	Alabama	Hanging	
68	June 17, 1910	Ernest Wirth	50	50	0	Male	White	California	Hanging	
69	June 17, 1910	Frank Brooks	21	20	1	Male	Black	Georgia	Hanging	
70	June 17, 1910	Jesse Cora	Unknown	Unknown	1	Male	Black	Georgia	Hanging	
71	June 20, 1910	Frank Barkar	23	21	2	Male	White	Washington	Hanging	
72	June 21, 1910	Wiley Young	Unknown	Unknown	Unknown	Male	Black	Alabama	Hanging	
73	June 21, 1910	Antonio Fornaro	31	29	2	Male	White	New York	Electrocution	
74	June 21, 1910	Benjamin Maynard Aston	43	42	1	Male	White	Pennsylvania	Hanging	
75	June 21, 1910	Walter W. Aston	25	24	1	Male	White	Pennsylvania	Hanging	
76	June 23, 1910	Frank F. Chicarine	21	20	1	Male	White	Pennsylvania	Hanging	
77	June 23, 1910	Nicholas Marengo	36	35	1	Male	White	Pennsylvania	Hanging	
78	June 24, 1910	John Luster Wynne	44	44	0	Male	Black	Texas	Hanging	
79	June 25, 1910	George Fields	Unknown	Unknown	6	Male	Black	Florida	Hanging	
80	July 1, 1910	Angelo Hamilton	27	26	1	Male	White	Virginia	Electrocution	
81	July 7, 1910	William Gilbert	31	30	1	Male	Black	New York	Electrocution	
82	July 8, 1910	John W. Canon	Unknown	Unknown	2	Male	Black	Texas	Hanging	
83	July 8, 1910	Henry Henderson	22	21	1	Male	Black	Texas	Hanging	
84	July 22, 1910	Robert Martin	Unknown	Unknown	Unknown	Male	Black	Illinois	Hanging	
85	July 25, 1910	Carl Loose	57	55	2	Male	White	New York	Electrocution	
86	July 25, 1910	Giuseppe Gambaro	43	42	1	Male	White	New York	Electrocution	
87	July 26, 1910	Harry Johnson	20	20	0	Male	Black	Pennsylvania	Hanging	
88	July 28, 1910	Napoleon J. Rivet	32	30	2	Male	White	Massachusetts	Electrocution	
89	July 29, 1910	Brooks Foley	36	36	0	Male	Black	Florida	Hanging	
90	July 29, 1910	Charles Walker	32	32	0	Male	Black	Georgia	Hanging	
91	July 29, 1910	John Junkin	24	23	1	Male	Black	Iowa	Hanging	
92	August 9, 1910	Pietro Silverio	39	38	1	Male	White	New Jersey	Electrocution	
93	August 12, 1910	Charley M. Miller	Unknown	Unknown	1	Male	White	Arkansas	Hanging	
94	August 13, 1910	Tolley Mason	Unknown	Unknown	1	Male	Black	Alabama	Hanging	
95	August 16, 1910	Arthur Rose	25	25	0	Male	Black	New Jersey	Electrocution	
96	August 19, 1910	Lawrence Dargan	Unknown	Unknown	1	Male	Black	Florida	Hanging	
97	August 30, 1910	Edward Howard Savage	35	Unknown	Unknown	Male	Black	New Jersey	Electrocution	
98	September 2, 1910	Harry Poe	17	17	0	Male	Black	Arkansas	Hanging	
99	September 2, 1910	William T. Swan	25	24	1	Male	Black	Ohio	Electrocution	
100	September 8, 1910	John Dirk Roselair	46	45	1	Male	White	Oregon	Hanging	
101	September 9, 1910	Isaac Newton Harrell	47	46	1	Male	White	Oregon	Hanging	
102	September 22, 1910	Arch Brown	32	32	0	Male	White	Virginia	Electrocution	
103	September 23, 1910	Pink Barbour	22	22	0	Male	Black	Virginia	Electrocution	
104	October 3, 1910	Brice McDonald	Unknown	Unknown	Unknown	Male	Black	Tennessee	Hanging	
105	October 6, 1910	Cecil Le Grange	39	37	2	Male	White	Pennsylvania	Hanging	
106	October 7, 1910	Bunk Sherrard	30	30	0	Male	Black	South Carolina	Hanging	
107	October 18, 1910	Derry Taft	27	Unknown	Unknown	Male	Black	Florida	Hanging	
108	October 28, 1910	Wilbur Benjamin	22	21	1	Male	Native American	California	Hanging	
109	October 28, 1910	Charles Scott	Unknown	Unknown	Unknown	Male	Black	Georgia	Hanging	
110	October 28, 1910	Robert M. Taylor	39	37	2	Male	White	Nebraska	Hanging	
111	November 4, 1910	Jesse Scott	Unknown	Unknown	Unknown	Male	Black	Mississippi	Hanging	
112	November 9, 1910	Love Bond	Unknown	Unknown	Unknown	Male	Black	Tennessee	Hanging	
113	November 9, 1910	John Casson	Unknown	Unknown	Unknown	Male	Black	Tennessee	Hanging	
114	November 9, 1910	Moses B. Cook	38	Unknown	Unknown	Male	White	Tennessee	Hanging	
115	November 10, 1910	Jake DeVauss	35	26	9	Male	Black	Georgia	Hanging	
116	November 11, 1910	John Eccles	17	17	0	Male	Black	Virginia	Electrocution	
117	November 25, 1910	Hugh Connerly	26	26	0	Male	Black	Louisiana	Hanging	
118	November 25, 1910	Waverly Coles	20	Unknown	Unknown	Male	Black	Virginia	Electrocution	
119	December 2, 1910	Rafael Barela	30	30	0	Male	Hispanic	Arizona Territory	Hanging	
120	December 2, 1910	Cesario Sanchez	48	47	1	Male	Hispanic	Arizona Territory	Hanging	
121	December 9, 1910	Samuel Jackson	Unknown	Unknown	1	Male	Black	Louisiana	Hanging	
122	December 9, 1910	Louis Williams	Unknown	Unknown	1	Male	Black	Louisiana	Hanging	
123	December 14, 1910	William Burroughs	Unknown	Unknown	0	Male	Black	South Carolina	Hanging	
124	December 14, 1910	Clarence Ham	Unknown	Unknown	0	Male	Black	South Carolina	Hanging	
125	December 16, 1910	Harry Jim Sitlington	17	17	0	Male	Black	Virginia	Electrocution	
126	December 16, 1910	John Joseph Smyth Sr.	35	34	1	Male	White	Virginia	Electrocution	
127	December 23, 1910	Thomas Wayne	45	45	0	Male	Black	West Virginia	Hanging	

== Demographics ==
Gender
Male	127	100%
Female	0	0%
Ethnicity
Black	79	62%
White	43	34%
Hispanic	3	2%
Asian	1	1%
Native American	1	1%
State
Virginia	15	12%
New York	12	9%
Georgia	11	9%
Pennsylvania	10	8%
Arkansas	8	6%
Alabama	7	6%
Florida	7	6%
Texas	7	6%
Louisiana	6	5%
Missouri	4	3%
New Jersey	4	3%
Ohio	4	3%
Tennessee	4	3%
Arizona Territory	3	2%
South Carolina	3	2%
California	2	2%
Illinois	2	2%
Kentucky	2	2%
Mississippi	2	2%
North Carolina	2	2%
Oklahoma	2	2%
Oregon	2	2%
Washington	2	2%
Connecticut	1	1%
Hawaii Territory	1	1%
Iowa	1	1%
Massachusetts	1	1%
Nebraska	1	1%
West Virginia	1	1%
Method
Hanging	90	71%
Electrocution	37	29%
Month
January	17	13%
February	18	14%
March	8	6%
April	7	6%
May	10	8%
June	19	15%
July	12	9%
August	6	5%
September	6	5%
October	7	6%
November	8	6%
December	9	7%
Age
Unknown	35	28%
10–19	8	6%
20–29	40	31%
30–39	30	24%
40–49	11	9%
50–59	2	2%
60–69	1	1%
Total	127	100%

== Executions in recent years ==
Number of executions
1911	106
1910	127
1909	138
Total	371

Preceded by 1909	List of people executed in the United States in 1910	Succeeded by 1911
