= List of people executed in the United States in 1914 =

Ninety-nine people, all male, were executed in the United States in 1914, fifty-six by hanging and forty-three by electrocution.

== List of people executed in the United States in 1914 ==
No.	Date of execution	Name	Age of person			Gender	Ethnicity	State	Method	Ref.
No.	Date of execution	Name	At execution	At offense	Age difference	Gender	Ethnicity	State	Method	Ref.
1	January 2, 1914	Arthur Bosworth	28	26	2	Male	White	Vermont	Hanging	
2	January 3, 1914	Albert Canty	27	26	1	Male	Black	South Carolina	Electrocution	
3	January 3, 1914	Harry Thompson	33	32	1	Male	Black	South Carolina	Electrocution	
4	January 15, 1914	John D. Keeler	48	46	2	Male	White	Pennsylvania	Hanging	
5	January 16, 1914	Charlton Moore	54	Unknown	Unknown	Male	Black	Virginia	Electrocution	
6	January 19, 1914	Francis W. Mulchfeldt	21	19	2	Male	White	New York	Electrocution	
7	January 27, 1914	Wilmer D. Potts	23	22	1	Male	Black	Pennsylvania	Hanging	
8	January 30, 1914	Willie Rhodes	27	Unknown	Unknown	Male	Black	Virginia	Electrocution	
9	February 3, 1914	John Erble Jr.	29	28	1	Male	White	Pennsylvania	Hanging	
10	February 6, 1914	Hill Granberry	52	Unknown	Unknown	Male	Black	Alabama	Hanging	
11	February 6, 1914	George Smith	Unknown	Unknown	Unknown	Male	Black	Georgia	Hanging	
12	February 9, 1914	Buck Hill	25	Unknown	Unknown	Male	Black	South Carolina	Electrocution	
13	February 10, 1914	Antonio Fiore	34	32	2	Male	White	New Jersey	Electrocution	
14	February 12, 1914	William M. Duncan	Unknown	Unknown	2	Male	Black	Georgia	Hanging	
15	February 20, 1914	John Chirka	40	Unknown	Unknown	Male	White	Indiana	Electrocution	
16	February 20, 1914	Harry Rasico	35	35	0	Male	White	Indiana	Electrocution	
17	February 27, 1914	Frank Caesar	Unknown	Unknown	Unknown	Male	White	Louisiana	Hanging	
18	March 4, 1914	James Plew	48	47	1	Male	White	Connecticut	Hanging	
19	March 6, 1914	R.W. Cobb	23	22	1	Male	White	North Carolina	Electrocution	
20	March 6, 1914	Henry Green	28	28	0	Male	Black	West Virginia	Hanging	
21	March 9, 1914	Tommie Lee	Unknown	Unknown	1	Male	Black	Texas	Hanging	
22	March 13, 1914	Bennie Henson	Unknown	Unknown	1	Male	White	Florida	Hanging	
23	March 14, 1914	Will King	Unknown	Unknown	1	Male	Black	Arkansas	Hanging	
24	March 19, 1914	Marion Lee	30	Unknown	Unknown	Male	Black	Virginia	Electrocution	
25	March 24, 1914	William Augustus Dorr Jr.	31	29	2	Male	White	Massachusetts	Electrocution	
26	March 27, 1914	Walter Boyd	24	Unknown	Unknown	Male	Black	Virginia	Electrocution	
27	March 28, 1914	Fred Pelton	37	Unknown	Unknown	Male	Black	Arkansas	Electrocution	
28	April 3, 1914	Thomas Green	23	22	1	Male	White	California	Hanging	
29	April 3, 1914	Simplicio Javellana	22	Unknown	Unknown	Male	Asian	Hawaii Territory	Hanging	
30	April 10, 1914	Jerry Allen	39	37	2	Male	White	California	Hanging	
31	April 10, 1914	Clarence Daly	Unknown	Unknown	1	Male	White	Florida	Hanging	
32	April 13, 1914	Francesco "Frank" Cirofici	27	25	2	Male	White	New York	Electrocution	
33	April 13, 1914	Harry Horowitz	25	23	2	Male	White	New York	Electrocution	
34	April 13, 1914	Louis Rosenberg	24	22	2	Male	White	New York	Electrocution	
35	April 13, 1914	Jacob Isaac Seidenshner	26	24	2	Male	White	New York	Electrocution	
36	April 17, 1914	Lee Nam Chin	30	28	2	Male	Asian	California	Hanging	
37	May 8, 1914	Matijins "Michael" Rikteraitis	29	28	1	Male	White	Connecticut	Hanging	
38	May 11, 1914	Leon Cardenas Martinez Jr.	19	16	3	Male	Hispanic	Texas	Hanging	
39	May 22, 1914	Joseph Thomas	Unknown	Unknown	0	Male	Black	Mississippi	Hanging	
40	May 22, 1914	Dave Washington	Unknown	Unknown	0	Male	Black	Mississippi	Hanging	
41	May 22, 1914	George Woods	32	Unknown	Unknown	Male	Black	Virginia	Electrocution	
42	May 26, 1914	Raffaele Longo	45	Unknown	Unknown	Male	White	New Jersey	Electrocution	
43	May 29, 1914	William R. Stewart	25	21	4	Male	White	Federal government	Hanging	
44	June 12, 1914	John Nick Wilburn	27	25	2	Male	White	Georgia	Hanging	
45	June 19, 1914	Robert Paschal	17	16	1	Male	Black	Georgia	Hanging	
46	June 19, 1914	George Hart	15	14	1	Male	Black	Georgia	Hanging	
47	June 19, 1914	William Hart	16	15	1	Male	Black	Georgia	Hanging	
48	June 19, 1914	Sidney Finger	21	21	0	Male	Black	North Carolina	Electrocution	
49	June 22, 1914	Pietro Rebacci	19	18	1	Male	White	New York	Electrocution	
50	June 24, 1914	Paschal Hall	Unknown	Unknown	1	Male	Black	Pennsylvania	Hanging	
51	June 25, 1914	Frank Wells	20	18	2	Male	White	Pennsylvania	Hanging	
52	June 26, 1914	Perry Mackey	Unknown	Unknown	Unknown	Male	Black	Alabama	Hanging	
53	June 26, 1914	Walter Pryor	Unknown	Unknown	Unknown	Male	Black	Alabama	Hanging	
54	June 30, 1914	Joseph Buonomo	24	22	2	Male	White	Connecticut	Hanging	
55	July 9, 1914	Jacob Franklin Schnabel	49	48	1	Male	White	Pennsylvania	Hanging	
56	July 10, 1914	Will Calloway	48	48	0	Male	Black	Virginia	Electrocution	
57	July 10, 1914	Silas Jones	32	Unknown	Unknown	Male	Black	West Virginia	Hanging	
58	July 14, 1914	James Linzi	24	23	1	Male	White	Pennsylvania	Hanging	
59	July 15, 1914	John Arthur Tillman	23	22	1	Male	White	Arkansas	Hanging	
60	July 31, 1914	Bartow Cantrell	18	17	1	Male	White	Georgia	Hanging	
61	July 31, 1914	James Cantrell	26	25	1	Male	White	Georgia	Hanging	
62	July 31, 1914	Henry Spencer	Unknown	Unknown	1	Male	White	Illinois	Hanging	
63	August 7, 1914	William Puryear	19	Unknown	Unknown	Male	Black	Virginia	Electrocution	
64	August 8, 1914	John Dolan	41	Unknown	Unknown	Male	White	New Jersey	Electrocution	
65	August 11, 1914	Joseph F. Bergeron	40	39	1	Male	White	Connecticut	Hanging	
66	August 14, 1914	Porfirio Torres	Unknown	Unknown	Unknown	Male	Hispanic	Texas	Hanging	
67	August 21, 1914	John Ragland	Unknown	Unknown	Unknown	Male	Black	Alabama	Hanging	
68	August 21, 1914	Grady Lane	20	18	2	Male	Black	North Carolina	Electrocution	
69	August 21, 1914	Henry Coach	33	Unknown	Unknown	Male	Black	Virginia	Electrocution	
70	August 28, 1914	Jim Cameron	25	24	1	Male	Black	North Carolina	Electrocution	
71	August 31, 1914	George Coyer	45	44	1	Male	White	New York	Electrocution	
72	August 31, 1914	Giuseppe De Gioia	31	30	1	Male	White	New York	Electrocution	
73	September 2, 1914	William Bressen	27	27	0	Male	White	New York	Electrocution	
74	September 2, 1914	Joseph J. McKenna	36	34	2	Male	White	New York	Electrocution	
75	September 4, 1914	John Davis	40	40	0	Male	Black	Georgia	Hanging	
76	September 5, 1914	Ezelle Heard	Unknown	Unknown	Unknown	Male	Black	Mississippi	Hanging	
77	September 11, 1914	Miles Lee Cribb	32	31	1	Male	White	Georgia	Hanging	
78	September 18, 1914	Seth Jefferson	Unknown	Unknown	0	Male	Black	Louisiana	Hanging	
79	October 2, 1914	Henry Slaughter	Unknown	Unknown	Unknown	Male	Black	Louisiana	Hanging	
80	October 16, 1914	Robert Collier	34	Unknown	Unknown	Male	Black	Indiana	Electrocution	
81	October 16, 1914	Harvey Gannaway	30	30	0	Male	Black	North Carolina	Electrocution	
82	October 30, 1914	Wash Gray	Unknown	Unknown	1	Male	Black	Alabama	Hanging	
83	October 30, 1914	Luther Sims	18	Unknown	Unknown	Male	Black	Alabama	Hanging	
84	October 30, 1914	Benny Ward	Unknown	Unknown	1	Male	Black	Alabama	Hanging	
85	October 30, 1914	Henry Wright	Unknown	Unknown	Unknown	Male	Black	Alabama	Hanging	
86	November 2, 1914	Joseph Toth	23	23	0	Male	White	New Jersey	Electrocution	
87	November 6, 1914	George Cotton	17	Unknown	Unknown	Male	Black	Louisiana	Hanging	
88	December 3, 1914	William Abel	39	38	1	Male	White	Pennsylvania	Hanging	
89	December 3, 1914	John Chimielewski	21	19	2	Male	White	Pennsylvania	Hanging	
90	December 4, 1914	Howard Craig	22	Unknown	Unknown	Male	Black	North Carolina	Electrocution	
91	December 4, 1914	Harley Beard	18	17	1	Male	White	Ohio	Electrocution	
92	December 4, 1914	Wesley Jenkins	30	Unknown	Unknown	Male	Black	Ohio	Electrocution	
93	December 8, 1914	Will Neeley	57	Unknown	Unknown	Male	Black	Arkansas	Electrocution	
94	December 9, 1914	Michael Sarzano	27	25	2	Male	White	New York	Electrocution	
95	December 11, 1914	Bob Myers	Unknown	Unknown	Unknown	Male	White	Mississippi	Hanging	
96	December 14, 1914	Henry Wilson	Unknown	Unknown	1	Male	Black	Texas	Hanging	
97	December 18, 1914	Arthur Hodges	21	20	1	Male	White	Arkansas	Electrocution	
98	December 18, 1914	John Edmunds	27	Unknown	Unknown	Male	Black	Virginia	Electrocution	
99	December 22, 1914	Stefano Ruggieri	17	17	0	Male	White	New Jersey	Electrocution	

== Demographics ==
Gender
Male	99	100%
Female	0	0%
Ethnicity
Black	48	48%
White	47	47%
Asian	2	2%
Hispanic	2	2%
State
New York	11	11%
Georgia	10	10%
Pennsylvania	9	9%
Virginia	9	9%
Alabama	8	8%
North Carolina	6	6%
Arkansas	5	5%
New Jersey	5	5%
Connecticut	4	4%
Louisiana	4	4%
Mississippi	4	4%
Texas	4	4%
California	3	3%
Indiana	3	3%
South Carolina	3	3%
Florida	2	2%
Ohio	2	2%
West Virginia	2	2%
Federal government	1	1%
Hawaii Territory	1	1%
Illinois	1	1%
Massachusetts	1	1%
Vermont	1	1%
Method
Hanging	56	57%
Electrocution	43	43%
Month
January	8	8%
February	9	9%
March	10	10%
April	9	9%
May	7	7%
June	11	11%
July	8	8%
August	10	10%
September	6	6%
October	7	7%
November	2	2%
December	12	12%
Age
Unknown	23	23%
10–19	11	11%
20–29	34	34%
30–39	18	18%
40–49	10	10%
50–59	3	3%
Total	99	100%

== Executions in recent years ==
Number of executions
1915	132
1914	99
1913	133
Total	364

Preceded by 1913	List of people executed in the United States in 1914	Succeeded by 1915
