= List of people executed in the United States in 1915 =

One hundred and thirty-two people, all male, were executed in the United States in 1915, sixty-eight by hanging, sixty-three by electrocution, and one by firing squad.

== List of people executed in the United States in 1915 ==
No.	Date of execution	Name	Age of person			Gender	Ethnicity	State	Method	Ref.
No.	Date of execution	Name	At execution	At offense	Age difference	Gender	Ethnicity	State	Method	Ref.
1	January 5, 1915	George Green	24	24	0	Male	Black	New Jersey	Electrocution	
2	January 5, 1915	Griffin J. Johnson	46	46	0	Male	Black	New Jersey	Electrocution	
3	January 5, 1915	Richard P. Sparks	16	16	0	Male	Black	New Jersey	Electrocution	
4	January 8, 1915	Arthur Neale	19	Unknown	Unknown	Male	Black	Virginia	Electrocution	
5	January 22, 1915	Louis Andrew Larson	44	43	1	Male	White	California	Hanging	
6	January 22, 1915	Lonnie Rowland	26	25	1	Male	Black	Florida	Hanging	
7	January 26, 1915	Adolph Kubaszewski	30	Unknown	Unknown	Male	White	New Jersey	Electrocution	
8	January 29, 1915	Burrett Hickman	Unknown	Unknown	1	Male	Black	Georgia	Hanging	
9	February 1, 1915	Ysidro Gonzalez	Unknown	Unknown	0	Male	Hispanic	Texas	Hanging	
10	February 2, 1915	August Martin	40	40	0	Male	White	New Jersey	Electrocution	
11	February 5, 1915	Eng Hing	20	17	3	Male	Asian	New York	Electrocution	
12	February 5, 1915	Yee Dock	30	27	3	Male	Asian	New York	Electrocution	
13	February 6, 1915	Floyd McCullum	24	Unknown	Unknown	Male	Black	South Carolina	Electrocution	
14	February 13, 1915	Roswell C. F. Smith	Unknown	Unknown	1	Male	White	Illinois	Hanging	
15	February 19, 1915	Henry Ballard	21	20	1	Male	Black	Texas	Hanging	
16	February 23, 1915	John Talap	32	30	2	Male	White	Pennsylvania	Electrocution	
17	February 26, 1915	Robert Kane	28	27	1	Male	White	New York	Electrocution	
18	February 26, 1915	Oscar Vogt	37	35	2	Male	White	New York	Electrocution	
19	February 26, 1915	Vincenzo Campanelli	36	Unknown	Unknown	Male	White	New York	Electrocution	
20	February 26, 1915	Will Hemphill	21	19	2	Male	Black	Texas	Hanging	
21	March 3, 1915	Federico Sanchez	15	15	0	Male	Hispanic	Texas	Hanging	
22	March 8, 1915	Rocco Tassone	25	23	2	Male	White	Pennsylvania	Electrocution	
23	March 12, 1915	Lewis Johnson	50	48	2	Male	Black	Alabama	Hanging	
24	March 15, 1915	John Bostic	24	22	2	Male	White	California	Hanging	
25	March 15, 1915	Samuel J. Raber	26	24	2	Male	White	California	Hanging	
26	March 17, 1915	Durant Haile	26	25	1	Male	Black	South Carolina	Electrocution	
27	March 19, 1915	Clay Simms	48	Unknown	Unknown	Male	Black	Arkansas	Electrocution	
28	March 22, 1915	Giuseppe Cino	23	22	1	Male	White	New York	Electrocution	
29	March 26, 1915	Charles Miller	29	Unknown	Unknown	Male	Black	Virginia	Electrocution	
30	April 2, 1915	John Hall	Unknown	Unknown	Unknown	Male	Black	Arkansas	Electrocution	
31	April 2, 1915	Walter Owens	Unknown	Unknown	1	Male	Black	Arkansas	Electrocution	
32	April 5, 1915	Nicholas Mondolo	Unknown	Unknown	Unknown	Male	White	Pennsylvania	Electrocution	
33	April 9, 1915	Will Bird	Unknown	Unknown	1	Male	Black	Georgia	Hanging	
34	April 15, 1915	Benigno Guerrero	Unknown	Unknown	1	Male	Hispanic	Texas	Hanging	
35	April 17, 1915	Joe J. Larkins	Unknown	Unknown	Unknown	Male	Black	Texas	Hanging	
36	April 30, 1915	Herbert Caple	22	Unknown	Unknown	Male	Black	Virginia	Electrocution	
37	May 11, 1915	Biagio Falzone	23	22	1	Male	White	Massachusetts	Electrocution	
38	May 14, 1915	Peter Krakus	25	25	0	Male	White	Delaware	Hanging	
39	May 21, 1915	Skipwith Sydner	25	Unknown	Unknown	Male	Black	Virginia	Electrocution	
40	May 31, 1915	Vincenzo Buoninsegno	36	35	1	Male	White	New York	Electrocution	
41	June 4, 1915	Thomas Cole	22	Unknown	Unknown	Male	Black	Virginia	Electrocution	
42	June 9, 1915	Alf Goolsby	47	Unknown	Unknown	Male	Black	Georgia	Hanging	
43	June 10, 1915	Lemuel Jones	24	23	1	Male	Black	Virginia	Electrocution	
44	June 11, 1915	Clyde Stover	27	27	0	Male	Black	Florida	Hanging	
45	June 11, 1915	John Turner	Unknown	Unknown	1	Male	Black	Louisiana	Hanging	
46	June 11, 1915	Luther Canter	23	23	0	Male	White	Virginia	Electrocution	
47	June 18, 1915	Henry Wilson	Unknown	Unknown	Unknown	Male	White	Louisiana	Hanging	
48	June 24, 1915	Harry Edgar Hillen	25	24	1	Male	White	Colorado	Hanging	
49	June 25, 1915	Lon Carter	Unknown	Unknown	Unknown	Male	Black	Alabama	Hanging	
50	June 25, 1915	Syd Jones	Unknown	Unknown	4	Male	Black	Alabama	Hanging	
51	June 25, 1915	Tim Sharp	Unknown	Unknown	1	Male	White	Alabama	Hanging	
52	June 25, 1915	Pak Sur Chi	38	Unknown	Unknown	Male	Asian	Hawaii Territory	Hanging	
53	June 30, 1915	Joseph Ferri	26	25	1	Male	White	New York	Electrocution	
54	July 2, 1915	Early Morris	Unknown	Unknown	Unknown	Male	Black	Alabama	Hanging	
55	July 2, 1915	David Dunn	20	19	1	Male	White	New York	Electrocution	
56	July 2, 1915	Cornelius Jackson	Unknown	Unknown	0	Male	Black	Texas	Hanging	
57	July 2, 1915	Will Stuart	Unknown	Unknown	0	Male	Black	West Virginia	Hanging	
58	July 2, 1915	Will Thomas	Unknown	Unknown	Unknown	Male	Black	West Virginia	Hanging	
59	July 8, 1915	Willie Bell	Unknown	Unknown	0	Male	Black	North Carolina	Electrocution	
60	July 9, 1915	Matthew Jarrell	24	23	1	Male	White	West Virginia	Hanging	
61	July 12, 1915	Andreas Plewka	30	28	2	Male	White	Pennsylvania	Electrocution	
62	July 16, 1915	Frank Repetto	27	26	1	Male	White	Illinois	Hanging	
63	July 16, 1915	William Henry Sprouse	41	40	1	Male	White	Missouri	Hanging	
64	July 28, 1915	Sam Derrick	30	29	1	Male	White	Arkansas	Electrocution	
65	July 30, 1915	Turner G. Graham Jr.	24	24	0	Male	White	Kentucky	Electrocution	
66	July 30, 1915	Will Lane	25	Unknown	Unknown	Male	Black	Kentucky	Electrocution	
67	July 30, 1915	Charles Becker	45	41	4	Male	White	New York	Electrocution	
68	July 30, 1915	Samuel Haynes	52	51	1	Male	Black	New York	Electrocution	
69	August 4, 1915	Tommie Grice	17	Unknown	Unknown	Male	Black	South Carolina	Electrocution	
70	August 6, 1915	Millard Carpenter	24	22	2	Male	Black	Alabama	Hanging	
71	August 6, 1915	George Wesley James	20	18	2	Male	White	Alabama	Hanging	
72	August 6, 1915	John Salter	23	23	0	Male	Black	Alabama	Hanging	
73	August 6, 1915	Robert Watkins	Unknown	Unknown	0	Male	Black	Alabama	Hanging	
74	August 6, 1915	Bernard Montvid	23	23	0	Male	White	Connecticut	Hanging	
75	August 6, 1915	Henry Floyd	Unknown	Unknown	1	Male	Black	Georgia	Hanging	
76	August 6, 1915	Peter Bolen	Unknown	Unknown	Unknown	Male	Black	Mississippi	Hanging	
77	August 6, 1915	Jim Seales	Unknown	Unknown	Unknown	Male	Black	Mississippi	Hanging	
78	August 6, 1915	Bunyan Walters	Unknown	Unknown	Unknown	Male	Black	Mississippi	Hanging	
79	August 13, 1915	Frank Grela	41	41	0	Male	White	Connecticut	Hanging	
80	August 13, 1915	John Wade	30	Unknown	Unknown	Male	Black	Florida	Hanging	
81	August 19, 1915	Will McGriff	Unknown	Unknown	4	Male	Black	Georgia	Hanging	
82	August 20, 1915	Ed Maddox	Unknown	Unknown	Unknown	Male	Black	Florida	Hanging	
83	August 20, 1915	Emmett Thomas	30	Unknown	Unknown	Male	Black	Florida	Hanging	
84	August 20, 1915	George Matthews	32	Unknown	Unknown	Male	Black	Virginia	Electrocution	
85	August 20, 1915	John Lewis Rollins	30	Unknown	Unknown	Male	Black	Virginia	Electrocution	
86	August 27, 1915	Franklyn Edward Creeks	33	32	1	Male	White	California	Hanging	
87	August 27, 1915	Wish Sheppard	18	18	0	Male	Black	Maryland	Hanging	
88	August 27, 1915	Karol Draniewicz	22	20	2	Male	White	New York	Electrocution	
89	September 2, 1915	Jesse McNeil	26	Unknown	Unknown	Male	Black	South Carolina	Electrocution	
90	September 3, 1915	Wallace Smothers	41	41	0	Male	Black	Kentucky	Electrocution	
91	September 3, 1915	James Eli "Charles" Trull	23	21	2	Male	White	North Carolina	Electrocution	
92	September 3, 1915	Antonio Salemne	26	25	1	Male	White	New York	Electrocution	
93	September 3, 1915	Pasquale Vendetti	47	46	1	Male	White	New York	Electrocution	
94	September 3, 1915	Lewis M. Roach	40	38	2	Male	White	New York	Electrocution	
95	September 3, 1915	Thomas Tarpey	42	Unknown	Unknown	Male	White	New York	Electrocution	
96	September 3, 1915	William Perry	27	26	1	Male	Black	New York	Electrocution	
97	September 6, 1915	S.L. Johnson	Unknown	Unknown	2	Male	White	Mississippi	Hanging	
98	September 10, 1915	David A. Fountain	48	47	1	Male	White	California	Hanging	
99	September 10, 1915	Edward Pryor	31	Unknown	Unknown	Male	Black	Virginia	Electrocution	
100	September 10, 1915	Charles Forest	Unknown	Unknown	Unknown	Male	Black	West Virginia	Hanging	
101	September 17, 1915	Sherman Stanfield	18	18	0	Male	Black	Virginia	Electrocution	
102	September 24, 1915	Joe Persons	14	14	0	Male	Black	Georgia	Hanging	
103	September 25, 1915	Frank Northfoot	Unknown	Unknown	2	Male	Black	Georgia	Hanging	
104	September 29, 1915	Nelson Brice	20	18	2	Male	Black	South Carolina	Electrocution	
105	September 29, 1915	John Crosby	33	31	2	Male	Black	South Carolina	Electrocution	
106	September 29, 1915	Meeks Griffin	25	23	2	Male	Black	South Carolina	Electrocution	
107	September 29, 1915	Thomas Griffin	27	25	2	Male	Black	South Carolina	Electrocution	
108	September 29, 1915	Joe Malloy	45	40	5	Male	Black	South Carolina	Electrocution	
109	October 8, 1915	Burr L. Harris	28	26	2	Male	Black	California	Hanging	
110	October 15, 1915	Ponciano Colaste	26	Unknown	Unknown	Male	Asian	Hawaii Territory	Hanging	
111	October 15, 1915	Juan Coronel	22	Unknown	Unknown	Male	Asian	Hawaii Territory	Hanging	
112	October 15, 1915	Feliciano Hirano	21	Unknown	Unknown	Male	Asian	Hawaii Territory	Hanging	
113	October 15, 1915	Charley Logan	17	17	0	Male	Black	South Carolina	Electrocution	
114	October 16, 1915	Joe DeBerry	21	21	0	Male	Black	Illinois	Hanging	
115	October 22, 1915	Ebenezer B. Tobin	44	43	1	Male	Black	Florida	Hanging	
116	November 5, 1915	Louis Bundy	21	19	2	Male	White	California	Hanging	
117	November 5, 1915	Earl Marvin Loomis	20	19	1	Male	White	California	Hanging	
118	November 8, 1915	Sam Hardin	Unknown	Unknown	0	Male	Black	Georgia	Hanging	
119	November 8, 1915	Jake Turner	18	18	0	Male	Black	Georgia	Hanging	
120	November 8, 1915	Guy Young	Unknown	Unknown	0	Male	Black	Georgia	Hanging	
121	November 19, 1915	John Henry	29	29	0	Male	Black	Kentucky	Electrocution	
122	November 19, 1915	Joe Emmanuel Hill	36	34	2	Male	White	Utah	Firing squad	
123	November 26, 1915	Frank Grano	Unknown	Unknown	0	Male	White	Maryland	Hanging	
124	November 30, 1915	Anthony Haronovich	26	26	0	Male	White	New Jersey	Electrocution	
125	December 7, 1915	Edgar C. Murphy	28	27	1	Male	White	New Jersey	Electrocution	
126	December 10, 1915	Ramon Villalobo	29	28	1	Male	Hispanic	Arizona	Hanging	
127	December 10, 1915	Henry Bookman	28	28	0	Male	Black	Oklahoma	Electrocution	
128	December 17, 1915	Will Johnson	Unknown	Unknown	Unknown	Male	Black	Georgia	Hanging	
129	December 17, 1915	Peter Bouy	Unknown	Unknown	Unknown	Male	Black	Louisiana	Hanging	
130	December 17, 1915	Worthy Tolley	50	48	2	Male	White	New York	Electrocution	
131	December 17, 1915	Ludwig Marquardt	58	Unknown	Unknown	Male	White	New York	Electrocution	
132	December 22, 1915	Lee Ingram	Unknown	Unknown	Unknown	Male	Black	Georgia	Hanging	

== Demographics ==
Gender
Male	132	100%
Female	0	0%
Ethnicity
Black	73	55%
White	49	37%
Asian	6	5%
Hispanic	4	3%
State
New York	19	14%
Georgia	12	9%
Virginia	11	8%
South Carolina	10	8%
Alabama	9	7%
California	8	6%
New Jersey	7	5%
Texas	7	5%
Florida	6	5%
Arkansas	4	3%
Hawaii Territory	4	3%
Kentucky	4	3%
Mississippi	4	3%
Pennsylvania	4	3%
West Virginia	4	3%
Illinois	3	2%
Louisiana	3	2%
Connecticut	2	2%
Maryland	2	2%
North Carolina	2	2%
Arizona	1	1%
Colorado	1	1%
Delaware	1	1%
Massachusetts	1	1%
Missouri	1	1%
Oklahoma	1	1%
Utah	1	1%
Method
Hanging	68	52%
Electrocution	63	48%
Firing squad	1	1%
Month
January	8	6%
February	12	9%
March	9	7%
April	7	5%
May	4	3%
June	13	10%
July	15	11%
August	20	15%
September	20	15%
October	7	5%
November	9	7%
December	8	6%
Age
Unknown	35	27%
10–19	9	7%
20–29	52	39%
30–39	17	13%
40–49	15	11%
50–59	4	3%
Total	132	100%

== Executions in recent years ==
Number of executions
1916	107
1915	132
1914	99
Total	338

Preceded by 1914	List of people executed in the United States in 1915	Succeeded by 1916
