= List of people executed in the United States in 1912 =

One hundred and sixty-one people, one hundred and sixty male and one female, were executed in the United States in 1912, one hundred and five by hanging, fifty-three by electrocution, and three by firing squad.

Virginia Christian became the last female juvenile offender to be executed in the United States.

== List of people executed in the United States in 1912 ==
No.	Date of execution	Name	Age of person			Gender	Ethnicity	State	Method	Ref.
No.	Date of execution	Name	At execution	At offense	Age difference	Gender	Ethnicity	State	Method	Ref.
1	January 5, 1912	Charley Harris	Unknown	Unknown	4	Male	Black	Arkansas	Hanging	
2	January 5, 1912	Elroy Kent	33	30	3	Male	White	Vermont	Hanging	
3	January 8, 1912	Philip Mangano	53	50	3	Male	White	New York	Electrocution	
4	January 12, 1912	Walter Bryer	Unknown	Unknown	Unknown	Male	Black	Alabama	Hanging	
5	January 12, 1912	Mark A. Wilkins	62	58	4	Male	White	California	Hanging	
6	January 12, 1912	Cliff Lee	Unknown	Unknown	Unknown	Male	Black	Louisiana	Hanging	
7	January 13, 1912	Tom Kinnon	Unknown	Unknown	0	Male	Black	Tennessee	Hanging	
8	January 16, 1912	Kid Glover	Unknown	Unknown	1	Male	Black	Georgia	Hanging	
9	January 16, 1912	Eijiro Nakamura	26	Unknown	Unknown	Male	Asian	Hawaii Territory	Hanging	
10	January 16, 1912	Antonio Luciano	28	Unknown	Unknown	Male	White	New Jersey	Electrocution	
11	January 26, 1912	Henry Coats	Unknown	Unknown	Unknown	Male	White	Arkansas	Hanging	
12	January 26, 1912	John McElvain	Unknown	Unknown	Unknown	Male	White	Arkansas	Hanging	
13	January 26, 1912	Sylvester Thomas	Unknown	Unknown	1	Male	Black	Arkansas	Hanging	
14	January 26, 1912	Silas Norman Phelps	39	38	1	Male	White	Massachusetts	Electrocution	
15	January 29, 1912	Albert W. Wolter	20	18	2	Male	White	New York	Electrocution	
16	January 30, 1912	Louis Oleva Johnson	20	Unknown	Unknown	Male	Black	Texas	Hanging	
17	January 31, 1912	Charles Howard	22	21	1	Male	Black	Kentucky	Electrocution	
18	February 5, 1912	Charles Swenton	29	27	2	Male	Black	New York	Electrocution	
19	February 9, 1912	William Claxton	Unknown	Unknown	Unknown	Male	Black	Louisiana	Hanging	
20	February 16, 1912	Henry Richards	Unknown	Unknown	Unknown	Male	Black	Florida	Hanging	
21	February 16, 1912	Dave Turner	30	Unknown	Unknown	Male	Black	Florida	Hanging	
22	February 16, 1912	Thomas Jennings	29	27	2	Male	Black	Illinois	Hanging	
23	February 16, 1912	Albert Varner	23	22	1	Male	Black	Texas	Hanging	
24	February 17, 1912	Thomas Schultz	24	23	1	Male	White	Illinois	Hanging	
25	February 17, 1912	Ewald Shiblawski	24	23	1	Male	White	Illinois	Hanging	
26	February 17, 1912	Frank Shiblawski	21	20	1	Male	White	Illinois	Hanging	
27	February 17, 1912	Phillip Somerling	34	33	1	Male	White	Illinois	Hanging	
28	February 19, 1912	James Lawrence Odom	50	48	2	Male	White	Alabama	Hanging	
29	February 22, 1912	Will Simms	Unknown	Unknown	0	Male	Black	Georgia	Hanging	
30	February 22, 1912	Charles West	Unknown	Unknown	1	Male	Black	Georgia	Hanging	
31	February 27, 1912	Matthew E. Vanaman	23	22	1	Male	White	Pennsylvania	Hanging	
32	March 5, 1912	Joseph A. Stott	28	27	1	Male	White	Pennsylvania	Hanging	
33	March 7, 1912	Harry Albert Claybaugh	22	21	1	Male	White	Pennsylvania	Hanging	
34	March 8, 1912	William B. Walker	Unknown	Unknown	2	Male	White	Georgia	Hanging	
35	March 8, 1912	Claib Dupree	Unknown	Unknown	Unknown	Male	Black	Louisiana	Hanging	
36	March 8, 1912	Frank Oteri	30	28	2	Male	White	Louisiana	Hanging	
37	March 8, 1912	Sam Turner	Unknown	Unknown	Unknown	Male	White	Louisiana	Hanging	
38	March 12, 1912	Mariano Bellini	25	Unknown	Unknown	Male	White	New Jersey	Electrocution	
39	March 15, 1912	James Barney Compton	33	32	1	Male	White	Texas	Hanging	
40	March 15, 1912	John Williamson	20	Unknown	Unknown	Male	Black	Virginia	Electrocution	
41	March 18, 1912	Domenico DiPasquale	26	24	2	Male	White	New York	Electrocution	
42	March 20, 1912	C. Caruso	Unknown	Unknown	Unknown	Male	White	New York	Electrocution	
43	March 26, 1912	Hezekiah Rasco	31	30	1	Male	White	Missouri	Hanging	
44	March 26, 1912	Henry Brent	43	42	1	Male	Black	Pennsylvania	Hanging	
45	March 28, 1912	Joseph Polachinus	22	19	3	Male	White	Pennsylvania	Hanging	
46	March 29, 1912	Andrea Tanganelli	26	25	1	Male	White	Connecticut	Hanging	
47	March 29, 1912	Will Bell	Unknown	Unknown	0	Male	Black	Georgia	Hanging	
48	March 29, 1912	Hezekiah Stevens	Unknown	Unknown	1	Male	Black	Georgia	Hanging	
49	March 29, 1912	Dan McCline	26	25	1	Male	Black	Texas	Hanging	
50	March 31, 1912	James Wilton Mensberger	Unknown	Unknown	1	Male	White	Illinois	Hanging	
51	April 13, 1912	Charlie McClennan	25	23	2	Male	Black	Texas	Hanging	
52	April 19, 1912	Willard P. Richardson	38	38	0	Male	White	Kentucky	Electrocution	
53	April 25, 1912	Leonidas W. Gilbert	Unknown	Unknown	1	Male	Black	Pennsylvania	Hanging	
54	April 30, 1912	William F. Reed	42	41	1	Male	White	Pennsylvania	Hanging	
55	April 30, 1912	Frank J. J. Morris	44	43	1	Male	White	Utah	Hanging	
56	May 3, 1912	William Alexander	24	23	1	Male	White	Florida	Hanging	
57	May 6, 1912	Salvatore Candido	27	25	2	Male	White	New York	Electrocution	
58	May 10, 1912	Henry Horee	Unknown	Unknown	Unknown	Male	White	Florida	Hanging	
59	May 10, 1912	Edward B. Alford	41	39	2	Male	White	Georgia	Hanging	
60	May 14, 1912	Tom McCrary	Unknown	Unknown	2	Male	Black	Georgia	Hanging	
61	May 17, 1912	John Sims	Unknown	Unknown	Unknown	Male	Black	Alabama	Hanging	
62	May 17, 1912	Brad Bagley	35	34	1	Male	Black	North Carolina	Electrocution	
63	May 21, 1912	Clarence Virgil Thompson Richeson	36	35	1	Male	White	Massachusetts	Electrocution	
64	May 22, 1912	Julius C. E. Szirmay	23	21	2	Male	White	Utah	Firing squad	
65	May 23, 1912	Antonio Romezzo	28	26	2	Male	White	Pennsylvania	Hanging	
66	May 24, 1912	Lige Burdine	Unknown	Unknown	Unknown	Male	Black	Georgia	Hanging	
67	May 24, 1912	Joseph V. Seng	32	Unknown	Unknown	Male	White	Wyoming	Hanging	
68	May 28, 1912	Nicolo Consuli	Unknown	Unknown	2	Male	White	New York	Electrocution	
69	May 31, 1912	Phillip Travis	24	23	1	Male	Black	Alabama	Hanging	
70	May 31, 1912	Eugene Baxter	Unknown	Unknown	0	Male	Black	Florida	Hanging	
71	May 31, 1912	Steve Johnson	Unknown	Unknown	0	Male	Black	Florida	Hanging	
72	May 31, 1912	Tom White	Unknown	Unknown	0	Male	Black	Florida	Hanging	
73	June 6, 1912	Enrico "Harry Marshall" Mascioli	25	23	2	Male	White	Massachusetts	Electrocution	
74	June 7, 1912	William Thomas Nichols	38	37	1	Male	White	Arkansas	Hanging	
75	June 11, 1912	Jan Ribarik	48	Unknown	Unknown	Male	White	Pennsylvania	Hanging	
76	June 14, 1912	John Furby	20	Unknown	Unknown	Male	Black	Virginia	Electrocution	
77	June 14, 1912	William Pierce	20	Unknown	Unknown	Male	Black	Virginia	Electrocution	
78	June 18, 1912	Ralph Friedman	25	23	2	Male	White	New York	Electrocution	
79	June 18, 1912	Jacob Kuhn	24	22	2	Male	White	New York	Electrocution	
80	June 21, 1912	Tim Powell	Unknown	Unknown	0	Male	Black	Arkansas	Hanging	
81	June 21, 1912	G.G. Wilkins	27	Unknown	Unknown	Male	Black	North Carolina	Electrocution	
82	June 21, 1912	Byrd Jackson	18	18	0	Male	Black	Virginia	Electrocution	
83	June 21, 1912	Clarence Nixon	24	Unknown	Unknown	Male	Black	Virginia	Electrocution	
84	July 5, 1912	Dink Jackson	34	33	1	Male	Black	Arkansas	Hanging	
85	July 5, 1912	Andrew Reed	Unknown	Unknown	1	Male	Black	Arkansas	Hanging	
86	July 8, 1912	Giuseppe Cerelli	23	22	1	Male	White	New York	Electrocution	
87	July 8, 1912	George Williams	31	30	1	Male	Black	New York	Electrocution	
88	July 8, 1912	Santo Zanza	25	24	1	Male	White	New York	Electrocution	
89	July 9, 1912	Frank Richardson	29	Unknown	Unknown	Male	Black	Alabama	Hanging	
90	July 12, 1912	John Henry	Unknown	Unknown	1	Male	Black	Texas	Hanging	
91	July 26, 1912	John Bailey	25	25	0	Male	White	Tennessee	Hanging	
92	July 26, 1912	George Shelton	19	19	0	Male	White	Tennessee	Hanging	
93	August 6, 1912	William Reed	24	24	0	Male	Black	South Carolina	Electrocution	
94	August 9, 1912	Andrew Taylor	27	27	0	Male	Black	Maryland	Hanging	
95	August 9, 1912	Wood Maxey	39	37	2	Male	Black	Texas	Hanging	
96	August 9, 1912	Sellars Vines	19	18	1	Male	Black	Texas	Hanging	
97	August 12, 1912	Lorenzo Cali	26	25	1	Male	White	New York	Electrocution	
98	August 12, 1912	John W. Collins	23	25	1	Male	Black	New York	Electrocution	
99	August 12, 1912	Vincenzo Cona	22	21	1	Male	White	New York	Electrocution	
100	August 12, 1912	Filippo DeMarco	25	24	1	Male	White	New York	Electrocution	
101	August 12, 1912	Salvatore DeMarco	28	27	1	Male	White	New York	Electrocution	
102	August 12, 1912	Joseph Ferrone	30	29	1	Male	White	New York	Electrocution	
103	August 12, 1912	Angelo Giusto	22	21	1	Male	White	New York	Electrocution	
104	August 13, 1912	Alex Weldon	55	53	2	Male	Black	South Carolina	Electrocution	
105	August 14, 1912	John Maruszewski	28	27	1	Male	White	New York	Electrocution	
106	August 16, 1912	Virginia Christian	17	16	1	Female	Black	Virginia	Electrocution	
107	August 22, 1912	John Cole	40	Unknown	Unknown	Male	Black	South Carolina	Electrocution	
108	August 23, 1912	Armistead White	Unknown	Unknown	Unknown	Male	Black	Alabama	Hanging	
109	August 23, 1912	Mack Strickland	Unknown	Unknown	0	Male	Black	Georgia	Hanging	
110	August 26, 1912	George Washington Rose	66	65	1	Male	White	Tennessee	Hanging	
111	August 30, 1912	Cal Miracle	34	33	1	Male	White	Kentucky	Electrocution	
112	August 31, 1912	Lewis J. Wechter	Unknown	Unknown	1	Male	White	Colorado	Hanging	
113	September 4, 1912	Sid Dunlap	Unknown	Unknown	0	Male	Black	Tennessee	Hanging	
114	September 6, 1912	John Hegwood	26	25	1	Male	White	Georgia	Hanging	
115	September 6, 1912	James Max	Unknown	Unknown	1	Male	Black	Louisiana	Hanging	
116	September 16, 1912	James Williams	21	20	1	Male	Black	New York	Electrocution	
117	September 17, 1912	Bertram Gager Spencer	31	28	3	Male	White	Massachusetts	Electrocution	
118	September 20, 1912	Edward Alexander	25	Unknown	Unknown	Male	Black	South Carolina	Electrocution	
119	September 24, 1912	Chester Stanton Jordan	32	27	5	Male	White	Massachusetts	Electrocution	
120	September 26, 1912	Harry Thorne	19	17	2	Male	White	Utah	Firing squad	
121	September 27, 1912	Amos Spinks	55	54	1	Male	Black	Arkansas	Hanging	
122	September 27, 1912	Harvey Woods	Unknown	Unknown	1	Male	Black	Arkansas	Hanging	
123	September 27, 1912	Caine Perry	Unknown	Unknown	0	Male	Black	Florida	Hanging	
124	September 27, 1912	Fortune Perry	Unknown	Unknown	0	Male	Black	Florida	Hanging	
125	September 27, 1912	Charles Smith	26	25	1	Male	Black	Kentucky	Electrocution	
126	September 27, 1912	James Smith	24	23	1	Male	Black	Kentucky	Electrocution	
127	September 30, 1912	Dan Lewis	Unknown	Unknown	Unknown	Male	White	Louisiana	Hanging	
128	October 1, 1912	Samuel N. Hyde	27	26	1	Male	White	South Carolina	Electrocution	
129	October 16, 1912	Sam Jones	45	45	0	Male	Black	Texas	Hanging	
130	October 18, 1912	George Leopold Engel	54	54	0	Male	White	Illinois	Hanging	
131	October 24, 1912	Thomas Riley	27	25	2	Male	White	Utah	Firing squad	
132	October 25, 1912	Oscar Daniels	17	17	0	Male	Black	Georgia	Hanging	
133	October 25, 1912	Ernest Knox	17	17	0	Male	Black	Georgia	Hanging	
134	November 1, 1912	Ferdinand F. Glaubitz	61	60	1	Male	White	Arkansas	Hanging	
135	November 1, 1912	George R. Redding Jr.	22	21	1	Male	White	Connecticut	Hanging	
136	November 4, 1912	Alexander Kompovic	62	62	0	Male	White	New Jersey	Electrocution	
137	November 8, 1912	Jack Baldwin	Unknown	Unknown	1	Male	Black	Georgia	Hanging	
138	November 8, 1912	Herbert Peyton	20	20	0	Male	Black	Virginia	Electrocution	
139	November 12, 1912	Clinton Glover	19	Unknown	Unknown	Male	Black	South Carolina	Electrocution	
140	November 15, 1912	Rocco Klawetch	46	45	1	Male	White	Ohio	Electrocution	
141	November 22, 1912	Alex Szafscur	43	Unknown	Unknown	Male	White	California	Hanging	
142	November 22, 1912	James Harlan Ellis	30	29	1	Male	White	Kentucky	Electrocution	
143	November 22, 1912	Dominic Salvaggio	36	35	1	Male	White	Ohio	Electrocution	
144	November 23, 1912	Robert Anderson	Unknown	Unknown	Unknown	Male	Black	Florida	Hanging	
145	November 29, 1912	Edward Williams	28	27	1	Male	Native American	California	Hanging	
146	November 29, 1912	Burrell Oates	40	32	8	Male	Black	Texas	Hanging	
147	December 4, 1912	Oscar Clyde	26	25	1	Male	Black	Georgia	Hanging	
148	December 6, 1912	Edward Delehantie	26	Unknown	Unknown	Male	Black	California	Hanging	
149	December 6, 1912	Willie Louis	44	41	3	Male	Asian	California	Hanging	
150	December 6, 1912	Wesley Miles	Unknown	Unknown	0	Male	Black	Maryland	Hanging	
151	December 13, 1912	Charles White	40	Unknown	Unknown	Male	Black	Alabama	Hanging	
152	December 13, 1912	Robert Lee Clay	26	25	1	Male	White	Georgia	Hanging	
153	December 13, 1912	Noble Walker	24	Unknown	Unknown	Male	Black	Georgia	Hanging	
154	December 13, 1912	Thomas Noble Joseph Faulder	29	28	1	Male	White	Oregon	Hanging	
155	December 13, 1912	Frank S. Garrison	38	38	0	Male	White	Oregon	Hanging	
156	December 13, 1912	Michael Morgan	42	42	0	Male	White	Oregon	Hanging	
157	December 13, 1912	H.E. Roberts	30	29	1	Male	White	Oregon	Hanging	
158	December 16, 1912	Matteo Dell'Omo	33	32	1	Male	White	New York	Electrocution	
159	December 19, 1912	Leo Temple	17	17	0	Male	Black	Tennessee	Hanging	
160	December 20, 1912	John Williams	Unknown	Unknown	Unknown	Male	Black	Louisiana	Hanging	
161	December 27, 1912	John S. Rogers	29	28	1	Male	White	California	Hanging	

== Demographics ==
Gender
Male	160	99%
Female	1	1%
Ethnicity
White	80	50%
Black	78	48%
Asian	2	1%
Native American	1	1%
State
New York	22	14%
Georgia	17	11%
Arkansas	11	7%
Florida	10	6%
Texas	10	6%
Pennsylvania	9	6%
Louisiana	8	5%
Alabama	7	4%
Illinois	7	4%
Virginia	7	4%
California	6	4%
Kentucky	6	4%
South Carolina	6	4%
Tennessee	6	4%
Massachusetts	5	3%
Oregon	4	2%
Utah	4	2%
New Jersey	3	2%
Connecticut	2	1%
Maryland	2	1%
North Carolina	2	1%
Ohio	2	1%
Colorado	1	1%
Hawaii Territory	1	1%
Missouri	1	1%
Vermont	1	1%
Wyoming	1	1%
Method
Hanging	105	65%
Electrocution	53	33%
Firing squad	3	2%
Month
January	17	11%
February	14	9%
March	19	12%
April	5	3%
May	17	11%
June	11	7%
July	9	6%
August	20	12%
September	15	9%
October	6	4%
November	13	8%
December	15	9%
Age
Unknown	44	27%
10–19	9	6%
20–29	62	39%
30–39	24	15%
40–49	13	8%
50–59	5	3%
60–69	4	2%
Total	161	100%

== Executions in recent years ==
Number of executions
1913	133
1912	161
1911	106
Total	400

Preceded by 1911	List of people executed in the United States in 1912	Succeeded by 1913
