= List of people executed in the United States in 1913 =

One hundred and thirty-three people, all male, were executed in the United States in 1913, seventy-six by hanging, fifty-five by electrocution, and two by firing squad.

== List of people executed in the United States in 1913 ==
No.	Date of execution	Name	Age of person			Gender	Ethnicity	State	Method	Ref.
No.	Date of execution	Name	At execution	At offense	Age difference	Gender	Ethnicity	State	Method	Ref.
1	January 2, 1913	Sam Boozer	42	41	1	Male	Black	South Carolina	Electrocution	
2	January 3, 1913	Will Wright	Unknown	Unknown	0	Male	Black	Alabama	Hanging	
3	January 3, 1913	J. Edward Brazzell	43	42	1	Male	White	Georgia	Hanging	
4	January 3, 1913	Philip Gibson	30	30	0	Male	Black	Maryland	Hanging	
5	January 3, 1913	Richard Quarles	29	Unknown	Unknown	Male	Black	Virginia	Electrocution	
6	January 4, 1913	Joseph Kwiatkowski	30	29	1	Male	White	New Jersey	Electrocution	
7	January 10, 1913	James Jacobs	Unknown	Unknown	Unknown	Male	Black	Maryland	Hanging	
8	January 10, 1913	John Robison	Unknown	Unknown	1	Male	Black	Texas	Hanging	
9	January 17, 1913	Solomon Williams	Unknown	Unknown	Unknown	Male	Black	Georgia	Hanging	
10	February 7, 1913	John Phillips	Unknown	Unknown	1	Male	Black	Georgia	Hanging	
11	February 10, 1913	George Bishop	23	22	1	Male	Black	New York	Electrocution	
12	February 10, 1913	Donato Cardillo	22	21	1	Male	White	New York	Electrocution	
13	February 10, 1913	Joseph Garfalo	38	35	3	Male	White	New York	Electrocution	
14	February 12, 1913	Frederick Albert Poulin	30	29	1	Male	White	New York	Electrocution	
15	February 14, 1913	Albert Warren	Unknown	Unknown	0	Male	Black	Alabama	Hanging	
16	February 14, 1913	Samuel William Rauen	26	25	1	Male	White	District of Columbia	Hanging	
17	February 18, 1913	Charles Ford	43	42	1	Male	White	New Jersey	Electrocution	
18	February 20, 1913	Frank Romeo	28	26	2	Male	White	Utah	Firing squad	
19	February 21, 1913	Percy Newkirk	29	29	0	Male	Black	Mississippi	Hanging	
20	February 28, 1913	Roy Sullivan	32	Unknown	Unknown	Male	White	Virginia	Electrocution	
21	March 14, 1913	Poolis Prantikos	28	26	2	Male	White	California	Hanging	
22	March 17, 1913	Albert L. Watson	46	45	1	Male	White	Louisiana	Hanging	
23	March 21, 1913	Arthur Thomas Jones	30	28	2	Male	White	Alabama	Hanging	
24	March 21, 1913	William Watson	28	26	2	Male	White	Alabama	Hanging	
25	March 21, 1913	Silas Williams	17	17	0	Male	Black	Kentucky	Electrocution	
26	March 21, 1913	Albert Prince	29	28	1	Male	Black	Nebraska	Hanging	
27	March 22, 1913	George Milton Humphreys	52	50	2	Male	White	Oregon	Hanging	
28	March 22, 1913	Charles T. Humphreys	47	45	2	Male	White	Oregon	Hanging	
29	March 24, 1913	William Wilson	27	Unknown	Unknown	Male	Black	Kentucky	Electrocution	
30	March 28, 1913	Floyd Allen	56	55	1	Male	White	Virginia	Electrocution	
31	March 28, 1913	Claude Swanson Allen	23	22	1	Male	White	Virginia	Electrocution	
32	March 31, 1913	William Twiman	35	33	2	Male	Black	New York	Electrocution	
33	April 4, 1913	John Adams	46	43	3	Male	Black	Alabama	Hanging	
34	April 4, 1913	Coleman German	Unknown	Unknown	Unknown	Male	Black	Alabama	Hanging	
35	April 4, 1913	Arnold A. Gilmer	29	28	1	Male	White	Alabama	Hanging	
36	April 4, 1913	C. Walter Jones	39	38	1	Male	White	Alabama	Hanging	
37	April 4, 1913	Walter Jones	27	25	2	Male	White	Alabama	Hanging	
38	April 4, 1913	Jake Williams	Unknown	Unknown	0	Male	Black	Florida	Hanging	
39	April 4, 1913	Frank Green	18	18	0	Male	Black	South Carolina	Electrocution	
40	April 4, 1913	John Marshall	19	Unknown	Unknown	Male	Black	West Virginia	Hanging	
41	April 4, 1913	James Williams	Unknown	Unknown	Unknown	Male	Black	West Virginia	Hanging	
42	April 11, 1913	John Bowman	22	20	2	Male	White	Kentucky	Electrocution	
43	April 18, 1913	Isom Taliaferro	31	30	1	Male	Black	Kentucky	Electrocution	
44	April 18, 1913	Jimmie Thomas	Unknown	Unknown	Unknown	Male	White	Louisiana	Hanging	
45	April 18, 1913	Charles Parker Rushing	40	40	0	Male	White	South Carolina	Electrocution	
46	April 21, 1913	Diggs Perry	Unknown	Unknown	Unknown	Male	Black	Texas	Hanging	
47	April 24, 1913	John Harris	33	32	1	Male	Black	Pennsylvania	Hanging	
48	April 25, 1913	James Brown	27	26	1	Male	Black	Kentucky	Electrocution	
49	April 25, 1913	John W. Gates	Unknown	Unknown	2	Male	White	New Mexico	Hanging	
50	April 25, 1913	Francisco Granada	Unknown	Unknown	2	Male	Hispanic	New Mexico	Hanging	
51	April 29, 1913	Dominick Petrelli	47	46	1	Male	White	Pennsylvania	Hanging	
52	May 2, 1913	Will Thompson	Unknown	Unknown	1	Male	Black	Georgia	Hanging	
53	May 2, 1913	Abraham Ortiz	21	Unknown	Unknown	Male	Hispanic	Texas	Hanging	
54	May 2, 1913	James Goode	28	28	0	Male	Black	Virginia	Electrocution	
55	May 5, 1913	William Lingley	30	29	1	Male	White	New York	Electrocution	
56	May 8, 1913	Frank M. Calhoun	58	56	2	Male	White	Pennsylvania	Hanging	
57	May 9, 1913	Jerry Lundy	Unknown	Unknown	2	Male	Black	Louisiana	Hanging	
58	May 9, 1913	Pat Mulloy	32	Unknown	Unknown	Male	Black	Tennessee	Hanging	
59	May 13, 1913	John B. Goodwin	27	24	3	Male	White	Federal government	Hanging	
60	May 14, 1913	Andriza Mircovich	34	33	1	Male	White	Nevada	Firing squad	
61	May 16, 1913	Demecio Delgadillo	28	27	1	Male	Hispanic	New Mexico	Hanging	
62	May 16, 1913	Alfred Wright	21	20	1	Male	Black	Virginia	Electrocution	
63	May 19, 1913	John Mulraney	31	29	2	Male	White	New York	Electrocution	
64	May 21, 1913	Raffaele Ciavarella	30	28	2	Male	White	New York	Electrocution	
65	May 23, 1913	Jake Crawford	Unknown	Unknown	Unknown	Male	Black	Georgia	Hanging	
66	May 23, 1913	Carter Tompkins	Unknown	Unknown	Unknown	Male	Black	Georgia	Hanging	
67	May 29, 1913	Arnie Johnson	26	25	1	Male	Black	Pennsylvania	Hanging	
68	May 30, 1913	John Henry Brock	45	44	1	Male	White	Texas	Hanging	
69	June 2, 1913	Clarence A. Schumann	Unknown	Unknown	1	Male	White	Arkansas	Hanging	
70	June 2, 1913	Gregorio Patini	21	18	3	Male	White	New York	Electrocution	
71	June 4, 1913	Michael Goslinski	22	21	1	Male	White	New York	Electrocution	
72	June 6, 1913	John Hix	Unknown	Unknown	Unknown	Male	White	West Virginia	Hanging	
73	June 6, 1913	Henry Sterling	22	21	1	Male	Black	West Virginia	Hanging	
74	June 9, 1913	Nathaniel Green	23	22	1	Male	Black	District of Columbia	Hanging	
75	June 17, 1913	Sanders Sylvanus	45	Unknown	Unknown	Male	White	New Jersey	Electrocution	
76	June 20, 1913	Tom Lawson	19	18	1	Male	Black	Kentucky	Electrocution	
77	June 20, 1913	Tom Martin	23	22	1	Male	Black	Kentucky	Electrocution	
78	June 20, 1913	F.L. Hargrove	39	38	1	Male	Black	Virginia	Electrocution	
79	June 24, 1913	Stefan Borasky	26	24	2	Male	White	Massachusetts	Electrocution	
80	June 27, 1913	Robert Johnston	Unknown	Unknown	Unknown	Male	Black	Alabama	Hanging	
81	June 27, 1913	Louis Saxon	29	28	1	Male	White	Connecticut	Hanging	
82	June 27, 1913	General May	41	41	0	Male	White	Kentucky	Electrocution	
83	June 27, 1913	Nelson Vernon Carter	47	47	0	Male	White	Virginia	Electrocution	
84	June 27, 1913	Owen Goggin	36	Unknown	Unknown	Male	Black	Virginia	Electrocution	
85	June 28, 1913	William Asbeck	42	41	1	Male	White	Texas	Hanging	
86	July 1, 1913	Sam Dukes	25	25	0	Male	Black	South Carolina	Electrocution	
87	July 2, 1913	Andrew Manco	28	27	1	Male	White	New York	Electrocution	
88	July 8, 1913	Hildo Bautista	20	20	0	Male	Asian	Hawaii Territory	Hanging	
89	July 8, 1913	Miguel Manigbas	19	19	0	Male	Asian	Hawaii Territory	Hanging	
90	July 8, 1913	Domingo Rodrigues	20	20	0	Male	Asian	Hawaii Territory	Hanging	
91	July 11, 1913	Frank Bauweraerts	37	36	1	Male	White	California	Hanging	
92	July 11, 1913	Jacob Oppenheimer	35	33	2	Male	White	California	Hanging	
93	July 11, 1913	Oscar Dewberry	Unknown	Unknown	1	Male	Black	Georgia	Hanging	
94	July 14, 1913	Elijah Green Wood	35	34	1	Male	Black	Arkansas	Hanging	
95	July 14, 1913	Manning Lee Garrett	48	48	0	Male	White	South Carolina	Electrocution	
96	July 23, 1913	Hersey Mitchell	26	Unknown	Unknown	Male	Black	Florida	Hanging	
97	July 28, 1913	Alvin Hugh Gaylord	Unknown	Unknown	1	Male	Black	Arkansas	Hanging	
98	August 1, 1913	Floyd Stanton Jr.	38	37	1	Male	Black	Texas	Hanging	
99	August 4, 1913	Anthony William Grace	25	24	1	Male	White	New York	Electrocution	
100	August 7, 1913	Paul Fowler	Unknown	Unknown	Unknown	Male	Black	Texas	Hanging	
101	August 7, 1913	Ernest Harrison	Unknown	Unknown	Unknown	Male	Black	Texas	Hanging	
102	August 8, 1913	Herman Kelly	23	23	0	Male	Black	South Carolina	Electrocution	
103	August 8, 1913	Benjamin Franklin Bailey	21	21	0	Male	Black	Virginia	Electrocution	
104	August 11, 1913	Odus Davidson	30	29	1	Male	White	Arkansas	Hanging	
105	August 16, 1913	William Glenn	26	Unknown	Unknown	Male	Black	Virginia	Electrocution	
106	August 18, 1913	Ernest Mullivee	21	Unknown	Unknown	Male	Black	South Carolina	Electrocution	
107	August 22, 1913	Frank Collier	Unknown	Unknown	1	Male	Black	Georgia	Hanging	
108	September 4, 1913	Jasper Green	40	40	0	Male	Black	South Carolina	Electrocution	
109	September 4, 1913	David Reynolds	Unknown	Unknown	0	Male	Black	South Carolina	Electrocution	
110	September 5, 1913	Lee Simms	21	21	0	Male	Black	Arkansas	Electrocution	
111	September 11, 1913	Omer O. Davis	19	18	1	Male	White	Arkansas	Hanging	
112	September 19, 1913	Parris Wyatt	Unknown	Unknown	0	Male	Black	Louisiana	Hanging	
113	October 17, 1913	Ed Kitchens	28	28	0	Male	Black	Georgia	Hanging	
114	October 23, 1913	John W. Maus	29	28	1	Male	White	Pennsylvania	Hanging	
115	October 31, 1913	Frank Seymour	19	18	1	Male	Hispanic	Oregon	Hanging	
116	October 31, 1913	Michael Spanos	21	20	1	Male	White	Oregon	Hanging	
117	October 31, 1913	Minnie Collins	20	Unknown	Unknown	Male	Black	Virginia	Electrocution	
118	November 14, 1913	Oswald C. Hansel	45	45	0	Male	White	Oregon	Hanging	
119	November 14, 1913	John Warren Jenkins	35	34	1	Male	White	Wyoming	Hanging	
120	November 25, 1913	Louis Pellazi	Unknown	Unknown	1	Male	White	Pennsylvania	Hanging	
121	December 2, 1913	William Diamond	21	21	0	Male	Black	New Jersey	Electrocution	
122	December 2, 1913	Frederick Christian Nye	20	19	1	Male	White	Pennsylvania	Hanging	
123	December 3, 1913	Joseph Richman	Unknown	Unknown	Unknown	Male	Black	South Dakota	Hanging	
124	December 4, 1913	Rosario Gigliotti	32	30	2	Male	White	Pennsylvania	Hanging	
125	December 5, 1913	Will Lonie	Unknown	Unknown	0	Male	Black	Mississippi	Hanging	
126	December 5, 1913	Lee Archer	22	Unknown	Unknown	Male	Black	Virginia	Electrocution	
127	December 5, 1913	Newell Hause Walker	29	29	0	Male	White	Virginia	Electrocution	
128	December 10, 1913	Nelson Sharpe	41	39	2	Male	White	New York	Electrocution	
129	December 12, 1913	Ed King	19	Unknown	Unknown	Male	Black	Arkansas	Electrocution	
130	December 12, 1913	Frank Kinney	55	55	0	Male	White	Ohio	Electrocution	
131	December 16, 1913	Edwin Williams	30	Unknown	Unknown	Male	Black	New Jersey	Electrocution	
132	December 22, 1913	Scott Madison	24	24	0	Male	Black	South Carolina	Electrocution	
133	December 30, 1913	William Overton	27	26	1	Male	Black	New Jersey	Electrocution	

== Demographics ==
Gender
Male	133	100%
Female	0	0%
Ethnicity
Black	67	50%
White	59	44%
Hispanic	4	3%
Asian	3	2%
State
Virginia	14	11%
New York	13	10%
Alabama	10	8%
South Carolina	10	8%
Georgia	9	7%
Kentucky	8	6%
Pennsylvania	8	6%
Texas	8	6%
Arkansas	7	5%
New Jersey	6	5%
Oregon	5	4%
Louisiana	4	3%
West Virginia	4	3%
California	3	2%
Hawaii Territory	3	2%
New Mexico	3	2%
District of Columbia	2	2%
Florida	2	2%
Maryland	2	2%
Mississippi	2	2%
Connecticut	1	1%
Federal government	1	1%
Massachusetts	1	1%
Nebraska	1	1%
Nevada	1	1%
Ohio	1	1%
South Dakota	1	1%
Tennessee	1	1%
Utah	1	1%
Wyoming	1	1%
Method
Hanging	76	57%
Electrocution	55	41%
Firing squad	2	2%
Month
January	9	7%
February	11	8%
March	12	9%
April	19	14%
May	17	13%
June	17	13%
July	12	9%
August	10	8%
September	5	4%
October	5	4%
November	3	2%
December	13	10%
Age
Unknown	30	23%
10–19	8	6%
20–29	49	37%
30–39	25	19%
40–49	17	13%
50–59	4	3%
Total	133	100%

== Executions in recent years ==
Number of executions
1914	99
1913	133
1912	161
Total	393

Preceded by 1912	List of people executed in the United States in 1913	Succeeded by 1914
