= List of people executed in Maine =

The following is a list of people executed by the U.S. state of Maine, or within present-day Maine prior to statehood. Capital punishment was sparsely used in Maine. It was abolished in 1876, reinstated in 1883, then abolished again in 1887. The only method of execution used in Maine was hanging, with the exception of three men executed by firing squad under martial law.

Executions by firing squad

Name	Race	Age	Sex	Date of execution	County	Crime	Victim(s)	Governor
Katherine Cornish	White		F	1644	York	Murder	Richard Cornish, white (husband)	John Winthrop or John Endecott
Joseph Quasson	Native American		M	June 29, 1726	York	Murder	Jonathan Boler, Native American	William Dummer
Patience Sampson	Mixed (Note: "Half-breed Indian".)	23	F	July 31, 1735	York	Murder	Benjamin Trott, 8, white	Jonathan Belcher
George Necho	Native American		M	August 7, 1740	York	Rape	Susanna Kimball, 3, white	Jonathan Belcher
Edmund Brown	White		M	September 4, 1740	York	Murder	David Bryant, white	Jonathan Belcher
John Seymour	White		M	August 11, 1755	York	Murder	Female, infant, white (daughter)	William Shirley
Tony (Note: Only slave executed in present-day Maine.)	Black		M	July 29, 1756	York	Murder	Female, child, white	William Shirley
Solomon Goodwin	White		M	November 12, 1772	Cumberland	Murder	David Wilson, white	Thomas Hutchinson
James McCormic	White		M	1773	Cumberland	Murder		Thomas Hutchinson
Jeremiah Baum	White		M	1780	Knox (Military)	Treason	N/A (Note: Accused of "conducting a marauding British party". Baum was of "feeble intellect" and many supporters of the revolution sought a pardon for "manifestly inoffensive" Baum, regretting the execution.)	N/A
John O'Neil	White		M	September 11, 1788	Lincoln	Murder	Michael Cleary, elderly, white	John Hancock
Thomas Bird	White	40	M	June 25, 1790	Cumberland (Federal) (Note: First federal execution in the United States.)	Murder	Capt. John Connor, white	John Hancock
Samuel Hadlock	White		M	October 28, 1790	Lincoln	Murder	Mr. Gott, white	John Hancock
Edmund Fortis	Black		M	September 25, 1794	Lincoln	Murder-Rape	Pamela Tilton, 14, white	Samuel Adams
Joseph Drew	White	24	M	July 21, 1808	Cumberland	Murder	Ebenezer Parker, 47, white (deputy sheriff)	James Sullivan
Ebenezer Ball	White		M	October 31, 1811	Hancock	Murder	John Tileston Downes, white (sheriff's deputy)	Elbridge Gerry
Two unknowns	White		M	December 1814	Hancock (Military)	Desertion	N/A	Caleb Strong
Seth Elliott	White		M	February 3, 1825	Knox	Murder	John Wilson Elliott, 3, white (son)	Albion Parris
Joseph Sager	White		M	January 2, 1835 (Note: Last public execution in Maine.)	Kennebec	Murder	Female, white (wife)	Samuel E. Smith
Abram Cox	Black		M	August 27, 1860	Androscoggin (Federal)	Murder	Four people, white (Note: Capt. Daniel Humphrey, two mates, and a seaman.)	Lot M. Morrill
Peter Williams	White		M	August 27, 1860	Androscoggin (Federal)	Murder	Four people, white	Lot M. Morrill
William H. Laird	White		M	July 15, 1863	Cumberland (Military)	Desertion	N/A	Abner Coburn
Francis Spencer	White		M	June 24, 1864 (Note: First execution at Maine State Prison.)	Knox	Murder	Richard Tinker, 67, white (warden)	Samuel Cony
Clifton Harris	Black	20	M	March 12, 1869	Androscoggin	Murder-Rape-Burglary	Mrs. Justin Kingsley and Polly Caswell, white	Joshua Chamberlain
Louis Wagner	White	31	M	June 25, 1875	York	Murder-Rape-Burglary	Anetha and Karen Christiansen, 25 and 39, white	Nelson Dingley Jr.
John Gordon	White		M	June 25, 1875	Waldo	Murder	Three people, white (Note: His 24-year-old brother Almon, Almon's wife Emma, and their two-year-old daughter.)	Nelson Dingley Jr.
Raffaele Capone	White	27	M	April 17, 1885	Penobscot	Murder-Robbery	Pasquale Coscia, white	Frederick Robie
Carmine Santore	White	44	M	April 17, 1885	Penobscot	Murder-Robbery	Pasquale Coscia, white	Frederick Robie
Daniel Wilkinson	White	38	M	November 20, 1885	Sagadahoc	Murder	William Lawrence, 63, white (police officer)	Frederick Robie

== See also ==
- Capital punishment in Maine
