= List of people executed in the United States in 1909 =

One hundred and thirty-eight people, one hundred and thirty-seven male and one female, were executed in the United States in 1909, one hundred and one by hanging, and thirty-seven by electrocution.

== List of people executed in the United States in 1909 ==
No.	Date of execution	Name	Age of person			Gender	Ethnicity	State	Method	Ref.
No.	Date of execution	Name	At execution	At offense	Age difference	Gender	Ethnicity	State	Method	Ref.
1	January 2, 1909	Lucius Truitt	27	27	0	Male	Black	Georgia	Hanging	
2	January 4, 1909	Frank Davenport	23	23	0	Male	Black	Virginia	Electrocution	
3	January 8, 1909	Thomas P. Fallon	40	36	4	Male	White	California	Hanging	
4	January 8, 1909	John Boyd	Unknown	Unknown	3	Male	Black	Texas	Hanging	
5	January 11, 1909	John Montessana	50	Unknown	Unknown	Male	White	New Jersey	Electrocution	
6	January 18, 1909	Sabino Millilio	32	Unknown	Unknown	Male	White	New Jersey	Electrocution	
7	January 22, 1909	Joe Thompson	Unknown	Unknown	Unknown	Male	Black	Arkansas	Hanging	
8	January 29, 1909	Charles Baldesar	36	35	1	Male	White	California	Hanging	
9	February 1, 1909	Salvatore Governale	25	24	1	Male	White	New York	Electrocution	
10	February 5, 1909	Walter Montgomery Johnson	28	27	1	Male	White	Oregon	Hanging	
11	February 5, 1909	Will Foster	Unknown	Unknown	2	Male	Black	South Carolina	Hanging	
12	February 12, 1909	Claude Golden	45	44	1	Male	Black	Texas	Hanging	
13	February 16, 1909	Leslie J. Combs	20	19	1	Male	White	New York	Electrocution	
14	February 17, 1909	Adolphus Walker	27	26	1	Male	Black	New Jersey	Electrocution	
15	February 18, 1909	Charles Gillespie	24	24	0	Male	Black	Virginia	Electrocution	
16	February 24, 1909	Giuseppe Campagnolo	28	27	1	Male	White	Connecticut	Hanging	
17	February 24, 1909	Raffaele Carfaro	19	18	1	Male	White	Connecticut	Hanging	
18	February 25, 1909	Irwin A. Lewis	28	26	2	Male	White	Pennsylvania	Hanging	
19	February 25, 1909	William Franklin "Frank" Palmer Sr.	37	35	2	Male	White	Pennsylvania	Hanging	
20	February 25, 1909	Johnnie Green	20	19	1	Male	Black	Texas	Hanging	
21	February 26, 1909	Cyrus Y. Timmons	37	36	1	Male	White	Oregon	Hanging	
22	March 2, 1909	Frank Gilbreath	Unknown	Unknown	Unknown	Male	Black	Tennessee	Hanging	
23	March 3, 1909	William Ward	Unknown	Unknown	Unknown	Male	Black	North Carolina	Hanging	
24	March 5, 1909	Charles Davis	Unknown	Unknown	1	Male	Black	Louisiana	Hanging	
25	March 5, 1909	Ben Jones	Unknown	Unknown	0	Male	Black	Louisiana	Hanging	
26	March 5, 1909	Wallace Jones	Unknown	Unknown	0	Male	Black	Louisiana	Hanging	
27	March 5, 1909	Charles Madison	Unknown	Unknown	1	Male	Black	Louisiana	Hanging	
28	March 5, 1909	Jack Ratier	Unknown	Unknown	1	Male	Black	Louisiana	Hanging	
29	March 5, 1909	Andrew Washington	Unknown	Unknown	1	Male	Black	Louisiana	Hanging	
30	March 5, 1909	Willie Williams	Unknown	Unknown	2	Male	Black	Louisiana	Hanging	
31	March 5, 1909	Robert Meade Shumway	27	26	1	Male	White	Nebraska	Hanging	
32	March 8, 1909	William Jones	27	25	2	Male	Black	New York	Electrocution	
33	March 9, 1909	Charles Edward Quimby	25	24	1	Male	White	Pennsylvania	Hanging	
34	March 16, 1909	Salvatore Randazzio	22	21	1	Male	White	New York	Electrocution	
35	March 19, 1909	Benjamin Franklin Gilbert Jr.	19	18	1	Male	White	Virginia	Electrocution	
36	March 22, 1909	Aurelius Christian	17	17	0	Male	Black	Virginia	Electrocution	
37	March 23, 1909	Frederick Lang	26	23	3	Male	White	New Jersey	Hanging	
38	March 25, 1909	John Karaffa	34	32	2	Male	White	Pennsylvania	Hanging	
39	March 29, 1909	Mary D. Farmer	29	28	1	Female	White	New York	Electrocution	
40	March 31, 1909	George Watson	Unknown	Unknown	Unknown	Male	Black	Alabama	Hanging	
41	April 2, 1909	Frederick B. LeBeau	41	40	1	Male	White	Montana	Hanging	
42	April 2, 1909	William A. Hayes	27	26	1	Male	White	Montana	Hanging	
43	April 8, 1909	James Smith	24	24	0	Male	Black	Virginia	Electrocution	
44	April 9, 1909	Joel T. Payne	32	30	2	Male	Black	Virginia	Hanging	
45	April 12, 1909	Bernard Carlin	22	21	1	Male	White	New York	Electrocution	
46	April 16, 1909	William Carter	29	Unknown	Unknown	Male	Black	Kentucky	Hanging	
47	April 16, 1909	Harry Seaborne	22	Unknown	Unknown	Male	Black	Virginia	Electrocution	
48	April 16, 1909	Jose Niculas	22	21	1	Male	Asian	Washington	Hanging	
49	April 26, 1909	Pacy Hill	46	45	1	Male	White	New York	Electrocution	
50	April 30, 1909	Antonio Cipolla	26	25	1	Male	White	California	Hanging	
51	April 30, 1909	Willie Carter	Unknown	Unknown	1	Male	Black	South Carolina	Hanging	
52	April 30, 1909	John Brown	57	57	0	Male	Black	Virginia	Electrocution	
53	April 30, 1909	William Brown	33	33	0	Male	Black	Virginia	Electrocution	
54	May 5, 1909	Isham Taylor	32	32	0	Male	Black	Virginia	Electrocution	
55	May 5, 1909	Joe Taylor	34	34	0	Male	Black	Virginia	Electrocution	
56	May 7, 1909	Fred M. Seward	28	27	1	Male	White	Idaho	Hanging	
57	May 7, 1909	Lewis M. Jenkins	40	40	0	Male	Black	Virginia	Electrocution	
58	May 14, 1909	Love Robinson	Unknown	Unknown	1	Male	Black	South Carolina	Hanging	
59	May 14, 1909	Edmund Shelton	Unknown	Unknown	2	Male	Black	Texas	Hanging	
60	May 21, 1909	Will McFadden	Unknown	Unknown	Unknown	Male	Black	Florida	Hanging	
61	May 21, 1909	Charles Kaiser	Unknown	Unknown	0	Male	Native American	Nevada	Hanging	
62	June 4, 1909	Walter Ledbetter	Unknown	Unknown	1	Male	Black	Florida	Hanging	
63	June 11, 1909	Otis D. Smith	32	31	1	Male	White	Florida	Hanging	
64	June 11, 1909	Jim Jones	Unknown	Unknown	Unknown	Male	Black	Georgia	Hanging	
65	June 11, 1909	Refugio Juareque	Unknown	Unknown	1	Male	Hispanic	Texas	Hanging	
66	June 14, 1909	William Scott	22	20	2	Male	White	New York	Electrocution	
67	June 18, 1909	Henry Blankford	Unknown	Unknown	0	Male	Black	Louisiana	Hanging	
68	June 18, 1909	Monroe Smith	Unknown	Unknown	0	Male	Black	Louisiana	Hanging	
69	June 18, 1909	Adolph N. Nordstrom	28	28	0	Male	White	Oregon	Hanging	
70	June 21, 1909	Yi Hi Dam	Unknown	Unknown	Unknown	Male	Asian	Hawaii Territory	Hanging	
71	June 29, 1909	Jacob Edward Kobler	25	24	1	Male	White	Pennsylvania	Hanging	
72	June 29, 1909	Joseph Pagano	27	26	1	Male	White	Pennsylvania	Hanging	
73	July 1, 1909	Steve Veazey	49	48	1	Male	Black	Mississippi	Hanging	
74	July 2, 1909	George Hawkins	Unknown	Unknown	0	Male	Black	Florida	Hanging	
75	July 2, 1909	Joseph Quantrell Anderson	36	34	2	Male	White	Oregon	Hanging	
76	July 6, 1909	Giuseppe Sanducci	23	21	2	Male	White	New York	Electrocution	
77	July 8, 1909	Jim Wiggins	Unknown	Unknown	4	Male	Black	Georgia	Hanging	
78	July 8, 1909	Bruno Carbone	18	17	1	Male	White	Pennsylvania	Hanging	
79	July 8, 1909	Joseph Veltre	21	20	1	Male	White	Pennsylvania	Hanging	
80	July 9, 1909	Marshall Lewis	Unknown	Unknown	0	Male	Black	Georgia	Hanging	
81	July 16, 1909	Isaac Stephens	Unknown	Unknown	Unknown	Male	Black	Arkansas	Hanging	
82	July 16, 1909	Leonardo Gebbia	22	20	2	Male	White	Louisiana	Hanging	
83	July 23, 1909	Will Mack	Unknown	Unknown	1	Male	Black	Mississippi	Hanging	
84	July 29, 1909	Nicholas DeMarzo	25	24	1	Male	White	Pennsylvania	Hanging	
85	July 29, 1909	Stephen Sabo	40	39	1	Male	White	Pennsylvania	Hanging	
86	July 30, 1909	Claude Brooks	21	20	1	Male	Black	Missouri	Hanging	
87	July 30, 1909	John Flemming	27	Unknown	Unknown	Male	Black	Virginia	Electrocution	
88	August 5, 1909	Fontaine F. Lewis	32	31	1	Male	Black	Pennsylvania	Hanging	
89	August 10, 1909	Albert Smith	Unknown	Unknown	Unknown	Male	Black	Florida	Hanging	
90	August 10, 1909	Adolph Bertchey	49	49	0	Male	White	New Jersey	Electrocution	
91	August 27, 1909	William H. Wise	29	Unknown	Unknown	Male	Black	Virginia	Electrocution	
92	August 27, 1909	Joseph M. Gauvette	44	43	1	Male	White	Washington	Hanging	
93	August 27, 1909	Arthur Brown	Unknown	Unknown	Unknown	Male	Black	West Virginia	Hanging	
94	September 3, 1909	Marcellus Thomas	Unknown	Unknown	Unknown	Male	Black	Texas	Hanging	
95	September 7, 1909	Richard Donegan	27	27	0	Male	White	New Jersey	Electrocution	
96	September 10, 1909	John McDaniel	Unknown	Unknown	0	Male	Black	Mississippi	Hanging	
97	September 24, 1909	George Williams	Unknown	Unknown	2	Male	Native American	Nevada	Hanging	
98	September 24, 1909	Howard H. Bragg	24	23	1	Male	White	Virginia	Electrocution	
99	October 1, 1909	William Hawkins	Unknown	Unknown	0	Male	Black	Georgia	Hanging	
100	October 1, 1909	William Mitchell	42	41	1	Male	White	Tennessee	Hanging	
101	October 1, 1909	Cecil Palmer	Unknown	Unknown	1	Male	Black	Tennessee	Hanging	
102	October 1, 1909	Will McIntosh	Unknown	Unknown	0	Male	Black	Texas	Hanging	
103	October 1, 1909	Lee Russell	Unknown	Unknown	0	Male	Black	Texas	Hanging	
104	October 8, 1909	Emanuel Johnson	Unknown	Unknown	Unknown	Male	Black	Louisiana	Hanging	
105	October 11, 1909	Hom Woon	37	35	2	Male	Asian	Massachusetts	Electrocution	
106	October 11, 1909	Min Sing	31	29	2	Male	Asian	Massachusetts	Electrocution	
107	October 11, 1909	Leong Gong	19	17	2	Male	Asian	Massachusetts	Electrocution	
108	October 14, 1909	Stanley Nazarko	Unknown	Unknown	1	Male	White	Pennsylvania	Hanging	
109	October 14, 1909	Thomas Willis	29	27	2	Male	Black	Pennsylvania	Hanging	
110	October 15, 1909	Avery Asa Blount	34	33	1	Male	White	Louisiana	Hanging	
111	October 19, 1909	Thomas Wesley Johns	42	41	1	Male	White	Pennsylvania	Hanging	
112	October 22, 1909	Lewis Balaam	21	21	0	Male	Black	Alabama	Hanging	
113	October 22, 1909	William H. Stevenson	27	27	0	Male	White	Alabama	Hanging	
114	October 22, 1909	William Johnson	Unknown	Unknown	Unknown	Male	Black	Illinois	Hanging	
115	October 22, 1909	Matthias Jancigaj	28	27	1	Male	White	Oregon	Hanging	
116	October 22, 1909	Tom Willison	23	23	0	Male	Black	Texas	Hanging	
117	October 26, 1909	Rocco Racco	42	39	3	Male	White	Pennsylvania	Hanging	
118	October 28, 1909	Syl Bynum	Unknown	Unknown	0	Male	Black	Georgia	Hanging	
119	October 28, 1909	Jozo Higashi	25	Unknown	Unknown	Male	Asian	Hawaii Territory	Hanging	
120	October 29, 1909	Harry Edward Crooks	49	47	2	Male	White	Ohio	Electrocution	
121	November 12, 1909	James Anderson Finch	38	37	1	Male	White	Oregon	Hanging	
122	November 12, 1909	Jack Traynham	24	24	0	Male	Black	Virginia	Electrocution	
123	November 12, 1909	Hezekiah W. Barnes	26	25	1	Male	White	Washington	Hanging	
124	November 16, 1909	Emil W. Victor	21	21	0	Male	White	South Dakota	Hanging	
125	November 18, 1909	Stanley Marcavich	17	15	2	Male	White	Pennsylvania	Hanging	
126	November 19, 1909	J.B. Kellogg	Unknown	Unknown	0	Male	Black	Georgia	Hanging	
127	November 19, 1909	George Gilford	Unknown	Unknown	0	Male	Black	Louisiana	Hanging	
128	November 19, 1909	Alex Hill	Unknown	Unknown	0	Male	Black	Louisiana	Hanging	
129	November 19, 1909	Tom Hill	Unknown	Unknown	0	Male	Black	Louisiana	Hanging	
130	November 19, 1909	Henry T. Armstrong	Unknown	Unknown	1	Male	Native American	Oklahoma	Hanging	
131	November 22, 1909	Teodoro Rizzo	35	35	0	Male	White	New York	Electrocution	
132	December 2, 1909	Ferdinand Rosena	51	50	1	Male	White	Pennsylvania	Hanging	
133	December 6, 1909	Bedros Hampartjoomian	24	22	2	Male	White	New York	Electrocution	
134	December 9, 1909	Harry Robinson	23	Unknown	Unknown	Male	Black	Virginia	Electrocution	
135	December 17, 1909	Tom Roberson	Unknown	Unknown	0	Male	White	Alabama	Hanging	
136	December 17, 1909	Bud Davis	37	37	0	Male	Black	Louisiana	Hanging	
137	December 17, 1909	Robert Wright	28	27	1	Male	White	Texas	Hanging	
138	December 17, 1909	Clifton Breckenridge	19	19	0	Male	Black	Virginia	Electrocution	

== Demographics ==
Gender
Male	137	99%
Female	1	1%
Ethnicity
Black	70	51%
White	58	42%
Asian	6	4%
Native American	3	2%
Hispanic	1	1%
State
Virginia	18	13%
Pennsylvania	17	12%
Louisiana	16	12%
New York	11	8%
Texas	10	7%
Georgia	7	5%
New Jersey	6	4%
Oregon	6	4%
Florida	5	4%
Alabama	4	3%
California	3	2%
Massachusetts	3	2%
Mississippi	3	2%
South Carolina	3	2%
Tennessee	3	2%
Washington	3	2%
Arkansas	2	1%
Connecticut	2	1%
Hawaii Territory	2	1%
Montana	2	1%
Nevada	2	1%
Idaho	1	1%
Illinois	1	1%
Kentucky	1	1%
Missouri	1	1%
Nebraska	1	1%
North Carolina	1	1%
Ohio	1	1%
Oklahoma	1	1%
South Dakota	1	1%
West Virginia	1	1%
Method
Hanging	101	73%
Electrocution	37	27%
Month
January	8	6%
February	13	9%
March	19	14%
April	13	9%
May	8	6%
June	11	8%
July	15	11%
August	6	4%
September	5	4%
October	22	16%
November	11	8%
December	7	5%
Age
Unknown	48	35%
10–19	7	5%
20–29	49	36%
30–39	18	13%
40–49	13	9%
50–59	3	2%
Total	138	100%

== Executions in recent years ==
Number of executions
1910	127
1909	138
1908	116
Total	381

Preceded by 1908	List of people executed in the United States in 1909	Succeeded by 1910
