= Lynching of John Evans =

African American who was lynched in the U.S.

On Thursday, November 12, 1914, John Evans, a black man, was lynched in St. Petersburg, Florida, United States, by a mob of 1,500 white men, women and children. Evans was accused of the murder of Edward Sherman, a white real estate developer, and the attack of Sherman's wife, Mary. After word of the attack spread, and Mary Sherman claimed her attackers were "two negroes," a citywide search ensued. Suspicions immediately led to John Evans. Two days after the murder, a posse consisting of some of the city's most prominent and well-respected members stormed the St. Petersburg jail, threw a noose around Evans' neck and marched him to his death. Evans was hanged from a light post on the corner of Ninth Street South and Second Avenue. At first, he kept himself alive by wrapping his legs around the light pole. An unidentified white woman in a nearby automobile ended his struggle with a single bullet. The shot was fatal, but the rest of the crowd began shooting at Evans' dangling body until their ammunition was depleted.

== Background ==
Edward Sherman was a 55-year-old photographer and land developer from Camden, New Jersey. For several years he had operated a photography studio on Central Avenue, but in 1913 he directed his interests to real estate promotion. He purchased an isolated stretch of land on John's Pass Road, now called Thirtieth Avenue North, and planned on turning it into St. Petersburg's newest suburb, called Wildwood Gardens. Apart from a single-story bungalow he built for himself and his wife, the land had yet to be developed. The property was half a mile from its nearest neighbor, which at the time was considered "out in the country."

Sherman had 11 black men working on his property. Until only a few days before the murder, John Evans had been one of them. Evans, who came from Dunnellon to St. Petersburg only a few weeks before, had been working for Sherman as a chauffeur and performing other odd jobs. On November 7, three days before the murder, Sherman fired Evans. The reason is unknown, but an acquaintance said that Evans seemed to carry a grudge.

On the night of his death, Edward Sherman went to bed around 8 p.m., sleeping in an alcove with low narrow windows on either side and two larger ones in the front. His wife, Mary Sherman, was sitting in an adjoining parlor, making Christmas baskets out of grass and pine needles. At around 10 p.m., a shotgun was fired and Mrs. Sherman ran toward the bedroom where her husband lay, only to see the blast had blown his skull away. She said a black man then stuck a gun in her face, demanded money and threatened to kill her. Though she handed over about a hundred dollars, Mrs. Sherman said a second black man dragged her outside, beat her with a pipe and ripped some of her clothes. She did not explicitly say she was raped, but newspaper articles published after the fact implied she was. The two men ran off and Mrs. Sherman said she fainted. When she woke up to see her husband's corpse, she fainted again. She regained consciousness around 3 a.m. and stumbled over to a neighbor's house. The message was relayed from house to house until making it to one with a telephone. Police were notified of the incident and the word spread throughout the community that two black men had attacked the Shermans. Mrs. Sherman was taken to Augusta Memorial Hospital where she was said to be "hovering near death." As she came to, she told police she thought she recognized Evans' voice during the attack. Evans became the leading suspect. He was taken into police custody, but when brought before Mrs. Sherman for identification, she could not place him as her attacker and he was released.

A second man, Ebenezer B. Tobin, was also accused of the crime and was brought to the county jail in Clearwater, despite the arresting deputy's claim that he was not involved. Sheriffs kept news of the arrest quiet so mobs wouldn't be encouraged to infiltrate the jail and take matters into their own hands.

The next morning, rumors spread through word of mouth and sensational newspaper headline. Anxiety and rage triggered a massive manhunt by armed whites. Hundreds of black men were detained and questioned, and in some cases roughed up. Crowds dashed wildly around the city looking for suspects, some even scouring the woods north of town. The St. Petersburg Commission ordered all saloons be closed but Central Avenue remained crowded until midnight as white residents continued to speculate about the assailants' location. Black people fled, many evacuating their own neighborhoods. Some took trains, some walked along the Atlantic Coast Line tracks, and some took boats. About a hundred armed men surrounded Augusta Memorial Hospital, where they intended to prevent the escape of any suspect being brought before Mrs. Sherman.

On November 12, posses raided black homes early in the morning and took six men to jail. One group fired three shots at a black man walking alone on Ninth Street South. A posse raiding a house in Methodist Town, where Evans had lived, found a bloodstained shirt and shoes, which another resident said were Evans'. Though that resident later recanted his statement, the posse took it as sufficient evidence to pursue Evans again. After being released from jail, Evans had gone to work for a black man along Fifth Avenue South and Twenty-second Street. Someone revealed his whereabouts to the police, who gave directions to the posse. When the mob found Evans, they almost lynched him on the spot. Instead, they attempted to extract Evans' confession through torture. After hours without success, the mob took Evans back before Mrs. Sherman who, once again, could not identify him as one of her husband's murderers or as her attacker. Nevertheless, Evans was taken back to the city jail, where a mob, 1,500-strong, gathered. After threatening to kill the jailer, E. H. Nichols, the mob tore down part of the jail's sidewall, tossed a noose over Evans' neck and dragged him into the street. At least half of the city's white population then marched west down Central Avenue towards the black section of the city where Evans was killed. One eye-witness recalled the scene, "little kids with guns were shootin', and women standin' there shootin' and screamin' and yellin' and - and shootin'. It was the damndest mess you ever heard in your life, you never heard anything like it."

== Aftermath ==
In the early morning hours, after the crowd had dispersed, a policeman retrieved what was left of Evans' body. Much of the city was still in frenzy and white vigilantes continued to look for Evans' accomplices or sympathizers. There was even talk of burning down the entire black community. Some local blacks vowed to stand and fight, but many others fled in terror. Over the course of a few days, 179 black women and children were reported to have left on the afternoon boat to Tampa.

After learning that local vigilantes were planning to repeat the incident by storming Ebenezer Tobin's jail cell in Clearwater, Governor Park Trammell considered sending in the state militia to restore order. But calm slowly returned to the city, and military intervention ultimately proved unnecessary. A local coroner's jury, made up of 15 well-respected white men, determined that John Evans had died at the hands of "unknown" persons. By the end of November, most of St. Petersburg's black refugees had drifted back to the city.

Many highly respected citizens participated in the lynching — even some public officials. Police chief A. J. Easters and his officers made little effort to protect Evans from the mob and even promoted the community's vigilante spirit. On the afternoon before the lynching, the coroner's jury, who ultimately ruled Evans' lynching to have been by "unknown" suspects, held a secret meeting. Among St. Petersburg's image-conscious leaders, it was widely believed that swift retribution for the assault on the Shermans was the best way to restore the city's tarnished reputation.

About a year later, the case resurfaced. Ebenezer Tobin, who had been detained in prison, was put on trial for murder. His conviction and subsequent execution marked Pinellas County's first (and only) legal hanging in late October 1915.

== Press coverage ==
The local press perpetuated the community's outrage. The day after the murder, the St. Petersburg Independent's front-page headline read, "Slain As He Slept By Unknown Negro." The St. Petersburg Daily Times headline read "E.F. Sherman Is Brutally Slain While He Sleeps," and "Two Negros Accused of Most Atrocious Crime Here in Years." The story featured photos of Sherman a black man said to be the assailant. Although both the St. Petersburg Daily Times and the St. Petersburg Evening Independent editorialized against lynch law as an abstract principle, their news reports on the incident were highly sensationalized. By playing up the sexual theme, reports suggested that lynching was the inevitable outcome whenever a black man was sexually involved with a white woman. At this point in history, white women were strictly off limits to black men and many had died for their words or actions perceived to be threatening or insulting.

Lew B. Brown, the editor of the St. Petersburg Evening Independent, offered no apologies to the local black community and made a point of recognizing that John Evans was not a local. "It should be remembered," Brown wrote, "that John Evans was not a St. Petersburg negro; he came here only a few weeks ago from Dunnellon. It is usually the negroes who stray in here and stay only a short while who commit crimes. The bulk of the St. Petersburg negroes are honest, straightwalking people who are industrious and well-behaved." An editorial from the Ocala Star argued that Evans was "a bad character" who had been convicted of "grand larceny" by the Marion County Superior Court. The author wrote, "It was probably safe to lynch [Evans] on general principles whether he was guilty of the crime he was accused of or not."

Unlike the St. Petersburg media, reports in the Tampa Tribune and the Clearwater Sun were more inclined to denounce the lynching. An article in the Tampa Tribune featured an interview with a judge involved in the case. "As long as the man must die, he might as well die quickly and get the thing off the public mind," said the judge. " I am not in favor of violence but there are times when a speedy execution seems necessary. However, with this provision — and I insist upon being properly quoted if at all — no man should ever under any circumstances be made to suffer the penalty of another man's crime. Never should a man be hanged unless he has made a confession of guilt, of his own free will, without intimidating or torturing methods used to extract it from him. I have never in any way participated in the execution of any man, a I hope I never will; but should my opinion ever be asked I would say without reservation that no matter what the circumstances no man should be killed unless it is an absolute certainty that he is the guilty man. No greater crime or injustice can be accomplished than the killing of an innocent man in the expiation of another's crime."

Asked whether he thought the matter should have been further investigated, the judge said that "those things" took place from time to time and that when murder and criminal assault are committed the penalty is always death, whether administered by a court of law or by mob violence.

== Analysis and legacy ==
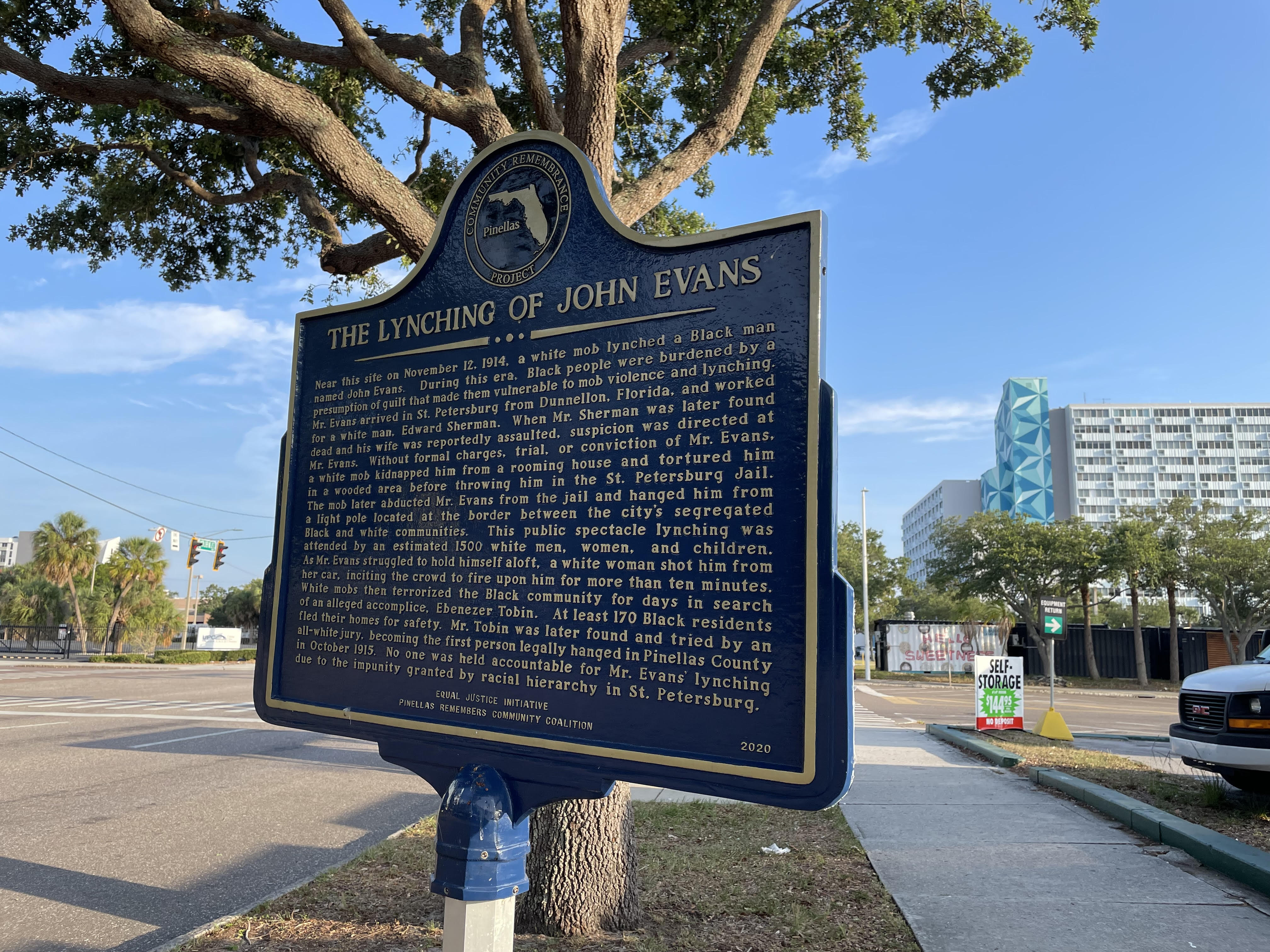
A memorial plaque for the lynching of John Evans near Second Avenue South and Martin Luther King Jr. Street.

Neither the guilt nor the innocence of John Evans and Ebenezer Tobin was ever proven because neither man was given a fair impartial trial. Most of the local population at the time was convinced that Evans and Tobin did in fact murder Edward Sherman, but both men insisted upon their innocence until their deaths.

In 1982, Jon Wilson, a journalist and historian, wrote a history of St. Petersburg. In his research he found that many people were reluctant to talk about the incident. Though he spoke to many residents who had been alive in 1914, nobody admitted to knowing anyone involved in the lynch mob. Some would agree to speak and then back out at the last minute. Others were hostile from the start. Wilson finds that this reluctance to discuss the lynching still exists today. He accredits this to the number of lynch mob descendants still living in St. Petersburg. He did, however, find some people that believed the suspects of Mr. Sherman's murder were white men in "black-face."

Of the fifteen coroner's jury members who assessed Evans' murder, only one man, Williams Dishman, dissented from the decision that it had been committed by "unknown" culprits. He was never reelected.

Decades later, his youngest daughter, Lily Bangert, wrote a play about the event. Near the 70th anniversary of Evans' lynching, the playwright was fatally shot by her husband — her play never making it the stage. The manuscript was copyrighted on October 13, 1981. One of the lead characters, Judge William Daniels, accuses another character, Fletcher Belcher, of being the real culprit, not Evans or Tobin. The playwright uses the real names of Belcher, Wilcox, the doctor who treated Ms. Sherman, and the police chief, Easters. No investigation was ever made into the murder of Edward Sherman.

A 3-by-5-inch aluminum plaque commemorating Evans' death once hung from a telephone pole near the scene of the lynching.

== See also ==
- Capital punishment in Florida
- List of people executed in Florida (pre-1972)
- List of people executed in the United States in 1915
