= Murder of Louise Beattie =

1911 murder

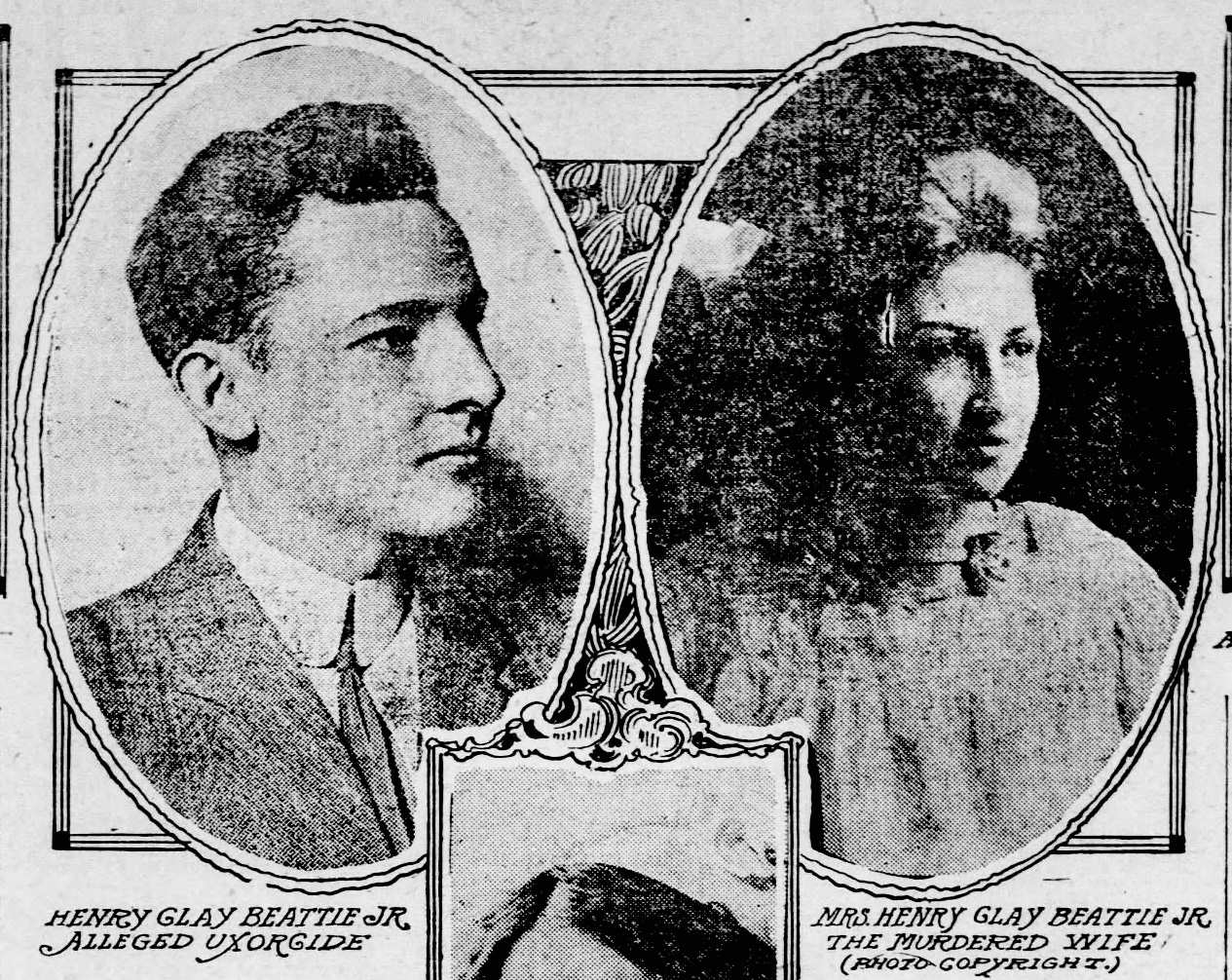
Mr. and Mrs. Henry Clay Beattie Jr.

The murder of Louise Beattie occurred on July 18, 1911 when Henry Clay Beattie Jr. (September 28, 1884–November 24, 1911), an American man from Virginia, shot and killed his wife, 23-year-old Louise Wellford Owen Beattie. The young couple had left their five-week-old baby at home for a midnight drive on the Midlothian Turnpike, with Beattie returning with a dead body in the car, his wife's head having been blown off by a shotgun blast. Beattie initially claimed to his wife's uncle that a "tall, bearded" highwayman had killed Louise. Beattie was arrested on July 21, 1911. Beattie pleaded not guilty.

The trial began at Chesterfield Courthouse on August 21. Beattie's cousin testified that he had purchased a shotgun and shells the Saturday prior to the murder and given them to Beattie. Evidence was presented that Beattie had been in a relationship with a teenage girl for the past four years, including during his marriage, resulting in the birth of a child that had died in infancy. At the trial, Beattie "denied emphatically that he ever loved" this teenage girl, but "did admit to having been with her three or four nights a week for the two weeks prior" to the killing of Louise Owen Beattie.

A local woman named Mandy Alexander testified that she had found a shotgun on the railroad tracks around 5 a.m. the morning after the shooting. The 16-day trial concluded with a 58-minute jury deliberation. The jury returned a guilty verdict on September 8. Beattie was sentenced to death and executed by electric chair at the Virginia State Penitentiary in Richmond, Virginia, four months after the murder. Louise Owen's parents took the baby home to raise in Delaware.

Kelly Harrell recorded a folk song about the Beattie murder in 1927. The lyrics were original; the tune was from the hymn "Knocking at the Door." A second recording was made in 1931, by Bob Cranford and A. P. Thompson of the Red Fox Chasers for the Starr Piano Company, with one verse changed, but the recording was never released. Folk song collectors have recorded lyrics to three variants. The first verse of a variant recorded in 1927 begins:

Come on honey, let's go for a spin
You won't need a wrap, just jump right in
No don't take the baby, we won't go far
With these last words, he started the car

== See also ==
- List of people executed in the United States in 1911

== Sources ==
- Cohen, Norm (2004). "August 1973 - 'Henry Clay Beattie' Once a Folksong". In Porterfield, Nolan (ed.). Exploring Roots Music: Twenty Years of the JEMF Quarterly. American Folk Music and Musicians Series 8. Bloomsbury Publishing PLC. pp. 78–85. ISBN 978-0-8108-4893-1.
