= Capital punishment in Maine =

Capital punishment has been abolished in the U.S. state of Maine since 1887.

There are twenty-one recorded people executed in the state of Maine between the years of 1644 and 1885. Ten of these executions were carried out before statehood (gained on March 15, 1820), and eleven after. Hanging was the only method of execution carried out in the state. All but two executed people were males, sixteen were white, two were Native American, and three were African American. Twenty of the twenty-one people executed were convicted of murder with only one man being executed for treason.

40-year-old escaped convict, Daniel Wilkinson, was the last person executed in Maine. He was hanged on November 21, 1885, for the murder of police constable William Lawrence. The death penalty in Maine was officially abolished in 1887 after his slow strangulation gave the anti-death penalty movement in Maine enough support.

== History of capital punishment in Maine ==
The first execution took place in Maine in 1644. In 1876 the Maine legislature abolished the death penalty by a vote of 75 to 68, but it was then reestablished in Maine in 1883. Maine abolished the death penalty a second time in 1887 mainly due to a botched execution attempt in 1885, when a poorly tied noose caused Daniel Wilkinson to die of strangulation, making him the last person to be executed in the state of Maine.

A bill was introduced by the Maine Legislature to reinstate the death penalty in Maine in 1925, but no action was taken on it. There were other attempts to reinstate the death penalty in Maine in 1937, 1973, 1975, 1977, and 1979 but no legislative actions were taken upon these attempts.

== Select death penalty recipients ==
=== Mrs. Cornish ===
Mrs. Cornish (first name unknown) is the first person on record to be executed by the state. She and her husband, Richard Cornish, moved to Maine in 1636 shortly after getting married in Massachusetts and in 1644, Richard's body was found in a river with stab wounds and a bludgeoned head. Mrs. Cornish denied any responsibility for the murder upon being questioned, but evidence for a motive surfaced when it was revealed that she was engaging in multiple affairs. She named one person, Edward Johnson, as one of her lovers. To test their guilt the authorities used "Trial by Touch", which involved having the guilty party touch the deceased's body; if the body bled, then the suspect was considered guilty of the crime. When performing this test Mr Cornish's body oozed blood, which the authorities used as evidence to prosecute and sentence Mrs. Cornish to death. She was executed by hanging in December 1645 in York, but denied any involvement in the murder up to the time of her death. Johnson was later acquitted of murder.

=== Jeremiah Baum ===
Baum is known as the only person to be executed by the state of Maine for treason, as all of the other people who were executed by the state were charged with murder.

=== Daniel Wilkinson ===
Daniel Wilkinson was executed for murder on November 21, 1885. He and his partner John Ewitt were caught trying to break into the Gould Ship Chandlery and fled. They were discovered by Officer William Lawrence, who threatened to arrest them but was shot in the head with a .32 caliber revolver by Wilkinson. Ewitt was able to flee to England and avoid prosecution, while Wilkinson was caught and arrested after about a week and was hanged for his crime. He died slowly by strangulation due to a poorly tied noose, a fact that was later used by the anti-death penalty movement in Maine to successfully argue for the elimination of the death penalty, making Wilkinson the last person to be executed by the state of Maine.

== See also ==
- Capital punishment in the United States
