= Daniel Wilkinson (murderer) =

American murderer

- Born: 1846; England, United Kingdom
- Died: November 21, 1885 (aged 38); Maine State Prison, Thomaston, Maine, U.S.
- Status: Executed
- Convictions: First degree murder Burglary
- Penalty: Death

Daniel Wilkinson (1846 – November 21, 1885) was the last person to be executed by Maine. He was hanged for the murder of a police officer after a burglary in Bath, Maine.

== Early life and personal life ==
Wilkinson was born near London, England. His father was reportedly a clergyman from England; Wilkinson reported the day before his execution that his parents were alive but that he had no contact with them in the four preceding years. When he was 15 years old, he emigrated to the United States. In 1866, he was sentenced to serve time in the Maine State Prison after a burglary conviction; he was released from prison in 1872.

The name "Daniel Wilkinson" was supposedly an alias, as a newspaper reporter with the Portland Daily Press wrote the day before his execution that "Wilkinson's actual name is not known. In fact it is in oblivion and probably never will be known."

== Murder, trial, and execution ==
In the early morning hours of September 4, 1883, Wilkinson and his accomplice, John Ewitt, were caught attempting to break into the D.C. Gould Ship Chandlery and Provision Store in Bath, Maine. As Wilkinson and Ewitt were running away from one police officer, they collided with Constable William Lawrence. Wilkinson immediately shot Lawrence in the head with a .32 caliber revolver.

Wilkinson was arrested in Bangor, Maine less than a week after the incident and was charged with murder on September 11, 1883. It was discovered that Wilkinson was an escapee from the Maine State Prison. Ewitt had travelled to England; his extradition was never sought by Maine. Wilkinson's trial began in the Bath Superior Court on January 4, 1884. He was convicted by the jury of first degree murder on January 7, 1884, and sentenced to death by hanging.

The death sentence was carried out at the Maine State Prison in Thomaston on November 21, 1885. Wilkinson did not die instantly from the hanging but slowly died of strangulation. The nature of Wilkinson's death, which was similar to the executions of two other inmates the previous April, was used by anti-death penalty activists to argue that Maine should abolish the death penalty, which it did in 1887.

== See also ==
- Capital punishment in Maine
- List of most recent executions by jurisdiction
