= Capital punishment in New Jersey =

Capital punishment in New Jersey has been abolished since December 17, 2007, when then-Governor Jon Corzine signed a bill repealing it. Prior to 2007, capital punishment was carried out in the state since the Colonial Era, with the earliest recorded execution happening in 1690 and the most recent execution happening in 1963. 361 people were executed in what is now the current state of New Jersey from 1690 to 1976.

== Early history ==
In the 17th century, when New Jersey was split between the colonies of East and West Jersey, each colony had individual rules regarding capital punishments; while East Jersey’s 1683 charter allowed execution for several situations, West Jersey’s 1676 charter made no mention of it. The first execution recorded in either colony was the execution of a slave named Tom, who was hanged in Monmouth County, East Jersey in 1690 for the charge of rape.

Following the 1702 merger of East and West Jersey into the Province of New Jersey, a law was passed in 1713 that authorized slave punishment by burning at the stake; numerous enslaved individuals were executed in this manner prior to the American Revolution.

The last execution for a crime other than murder was that of Andrew Clark, in 1872 for rape. The last woman executed in New Jersey was Margaret Meierhoffer, a housewife charged with murder, on January 6, 1881. With the exception of slaves executed by burning prior to 1753, executions in New Jersey were performed exclusively by hanging until 1907, when electrocution became the primary method. Only one person was executed by hanging after this, when Frederick Lang was executed on February 23, 1909 for murder. All executions from then on would be performed using Ole Smokey at the New Jersey State Prison.

The last execution performed in New Jersey was that of Ralph Hudson via electrocution for murder on January 22, 1963. Following Hudson’s execution, no executions were performed by the state before the 1972 Furman v. Georgia ruling by the Supreme Court of the United States, which led to a de facto ban on executions nationwide until laws meeting the revised standards of what crimes qualified for capital punishment could be enacted. The Supreme Court subsequently ruled in 1976‘s Gregg v. Georgia that these revised statutes were constitutional. However, New Jersey did not pass revised legislation until 1982, extending the de facto ban; the revised legislation specified that eligibility for capital punishment included anyone who "purposely or knowingly causes death" or someone who "contracts for the murder".

Under the 1982 statute, there were 228 capital trials. Of the 60 cases in which juries returned a verdict for capital punishment, 57 were overturned. Despite the overturns, eight inmates remained on death row by 2007, as in some cases an overturned death sentence resulted in a sentencing retrial that resulted in another death sentence. Three defendants were sentenced to death in 1983, and seven death sentences were issued in 1984. This continued in 1985 with seven issued, in 1986 with another six, and in 1987 with another eight.

A series of bills was introduced in the New Jersey General Assembly in 1992 to make it harder for New Jersey courts to overturn death sentence convictions, including legislation that would prevent the introduction of evidence regarding the method used for capital punishment during trials, as part of an effort to close off an “avenue for overturning death-penalty sentences". In May 1996, Assembly member Gary Stuhltrager criticized efforts to delay the imposition of the death penalty, saying "If you're going to have it, do it".

== 2007 repeal ==
In December 2005, the New Jersey Senate passed a one-year moratorium on executions by the state, with a commission to determine if the system is efficient and equitable. The measure was passed by the legislature on January 10, 2006, and then-Governor Richard Codey signed the measure into law on January 12. New Jersey became the first state to pass such a moratorium legislatively, rather than by executive order. The abolition vote was recommended by a report from the New Jersey Death Penalty Study Commission.

On December 17, 2007, Senate Bill S171 passed in the General Assembly by a 44–36 margin, and Governor Jon Corzine signed the bill the same day, making New Jersey the 14th state without a death penalty and the first state to abolish it by legislative action rather than by judicial decision since Gregg v. Georgia. Prior to the passage of the bill, a poll of New Jersey voters on December 11 determined that "53[...] percent [approve] the proposal to eliminate the death penalty in the state... [and] [b]y a substantial 78-18 percent margin, New Jersey voters would keep the death penalty for the most violent cases, such as serial killers and child killers." There is a change in ideology in the following days, given the December 17th vote.

Following the signing of Bill S171, all eight inmates on death row had their sentences commuted to life in prison without parole by Governor Corzine. Among the eight inmates whose sentence were commuted was Jesse Timmendequas, whose 1994 rape and murder of his 7-year-old neighbor Megan Kanka led to the creation of Megan's Law; John Martini, who kidnapped and killed Bergen County businessman Irving Flax in 1989; and Brian Wakefield, who was sentenced in 2007 for beating and stabbing an Atlantic City couple and setting their bodies on fire in 2001.

== See also ==
- List of people executed in New Jersey
- Crime in New Jersey
- Law of New Jersey
