= Capital punishment in Hawaii =

Capital punishment in Hawaii ended in 1957 when it was still an organized incorporated territory of the United States. About 75 people were executed by the government, all for the crime of murder, and all by hanging. Additionally, during and after World War II, three U.S. servicemen were executed by the United States Armed Forces by order of a general court martial.

== History ==
Under post-contact common law criminal justice, the penal laws of the Kingdom, Provisional Government, Republic, and U.S. incorporated Territory of Hawaii allowed for the execution of persons convicted of capital crimes. The Espy file and historian Joseph Theroux account for about 75 individuals executed between the national and territorial governments, all for murder and all by hanging.

During and a few years after World War II, three U.S. servicemen were executed by the United States Armed Forces by order of a general court martial between 1942 and 1947 at Schofield Barracks, all the cases involving either murder or rape. Two of the executions were by firing squad and the third was by hanging.

In On June 5, 1957, Hawaii, then still an organized incorporated territory of the United States, abolished the death penalty. Two men under death sentences at the time, Sylvestre Adoca and Joseph Josiah, were commuted to serving life without parole.

== Analysis ==
Hawaii's death penalty has received criticism for almost exclusively targeting racial minorities within the country. Very few executions in Hawaii were of white Americans or Native Hawaiians, to the point where some Hawaiians speculated that the abolition of the death penalty occurred "because there were too many haole (Caucasians) who risked hanging." Statistics show that only one white man, an Irish man named Frank Johnson (birth name John O'Connell), was ever executed in the Territory of Hawaii. The rest of the people confirmed to have been executed during that period were of various Asian nationalities, including Filipinos, Chinese people, Japanese people, and Koreans.

== Modern use ==
Naeem Williams, a discharged soldier, was tried in a federal civilian court in 2014 for beating his 5-year-old daughter to death. This crime was committed on U.S. government property in 2005 while Williams was on active duty. Prosecutors sought the death penalty in a federal court. However, he was spared execution by the jury and instead sentenced to life in prison without the possibility of parole. The jury had voted 8-4 in favor of a death sentence for Williams.

== See also ==
- Crime in Hawaii
- List of people executed in Hawaii

== Additional reading ==
- FindLaw: Hawaii Capital Punishment Laws
