= Arthur Shelby =

Arthur Shelby may refer to:

- Arthur Shelby, character in Uncle Tom's Cabin
- Arthur Shelby Snr, character in Peaky Blinders (TV series)
- Arthur Shelby Jr., character in Peaky Blinders (TV series)
- Arthur Shelby (murderer), see List of people executed in Texas, 1870–79
