= Yeomanry Cavalry (disambiguation) =

Yeomanry Cavalry was the mounted component of the British Volunteer Corps.

Yeomanry Cavalry may also refer to:

- Canterbury Yeomanry Cavalry
- Rutland Yeomanry Cavalry
