= Gallows =

Structure for execution by hanging

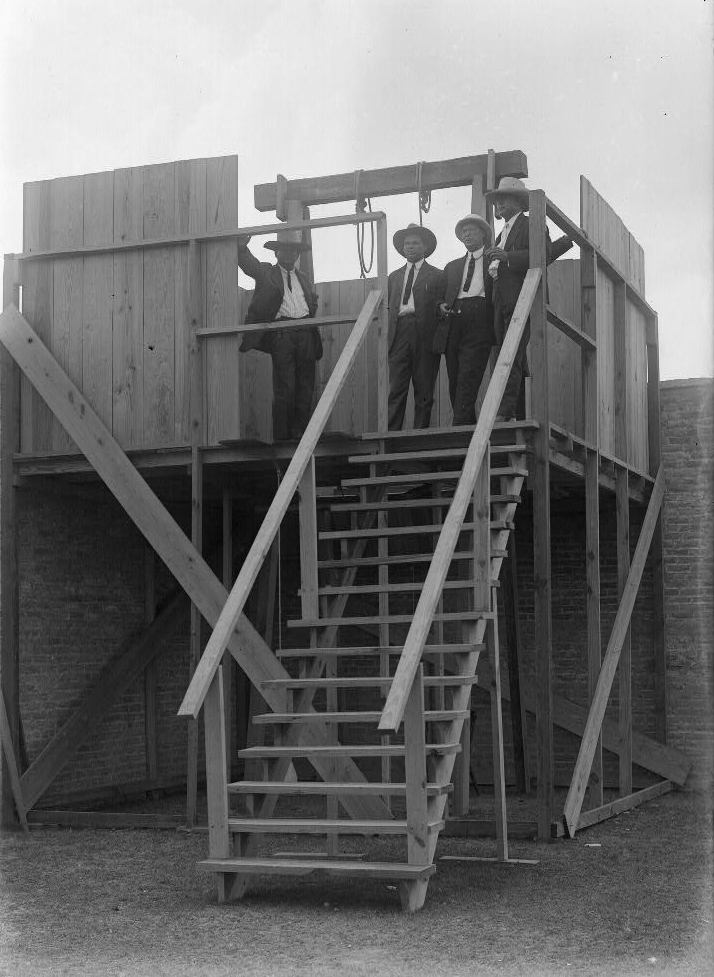
Unidentified men wait at the gallows before execution of Melquiades Chapa and Jose Buenrostro on May 19, 1916, in Brownsville, Texas.

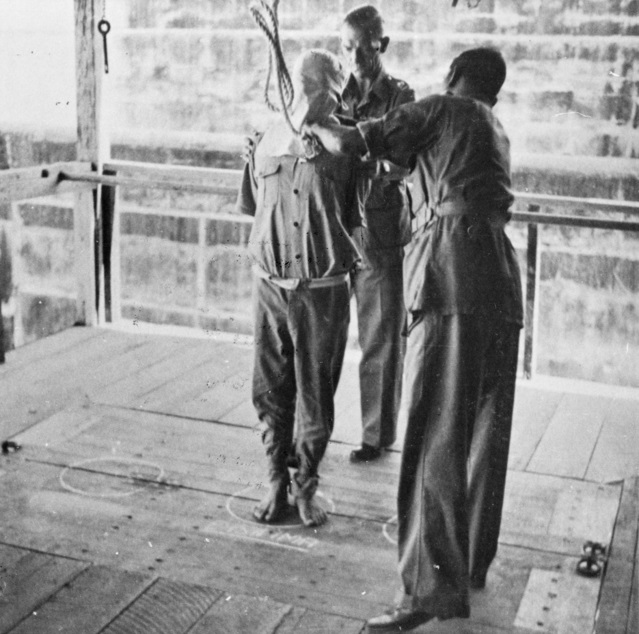
A hangman positions the noose around the neck of a Japanese war criminal as he is held steady by a British military officer just prior to his execution by hanging at the gallows in Changi Prison in Singapore 1946. The condemned man is standing within a circle on the trapdoor, and on either side of him are two other circles indicating that the gallows had the provision for multiple simultaneous executions.

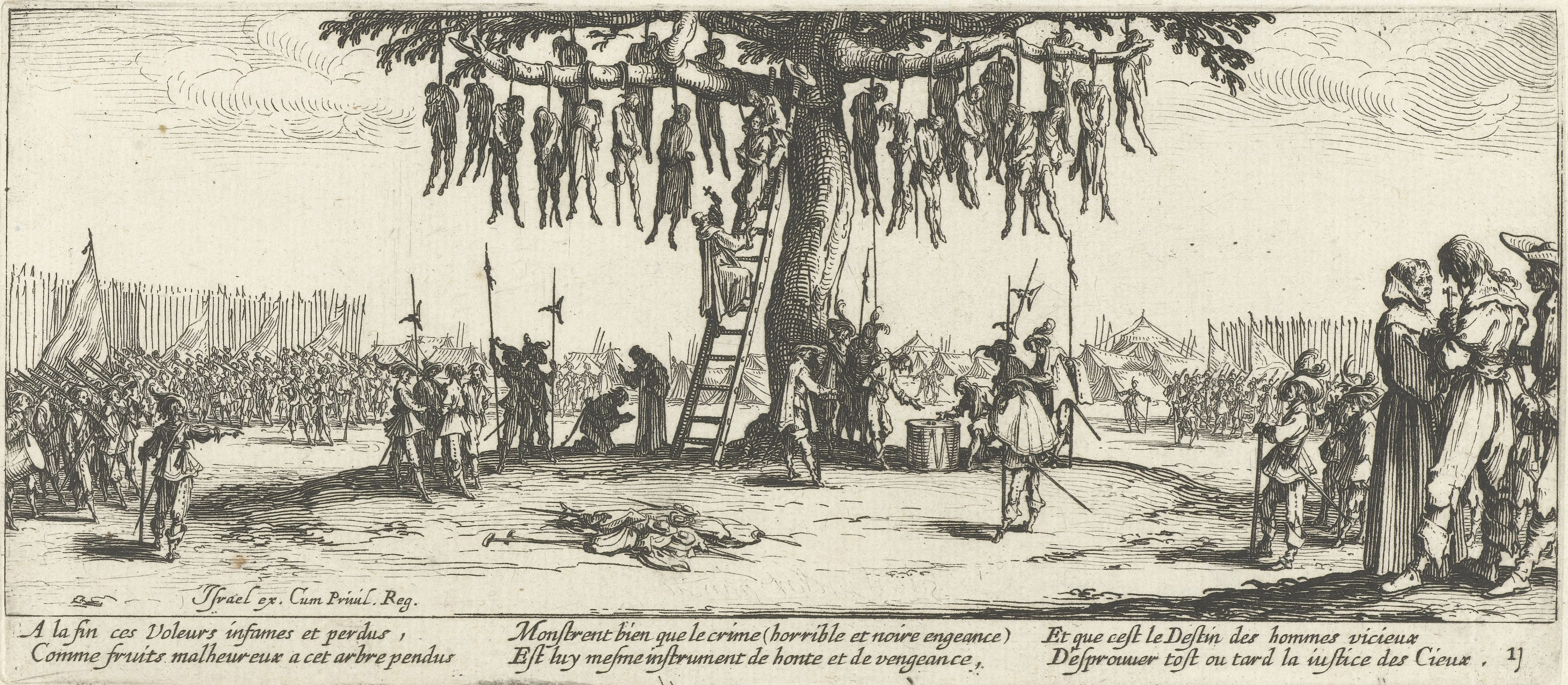
Illustration of hanging during the Thirty Years' War

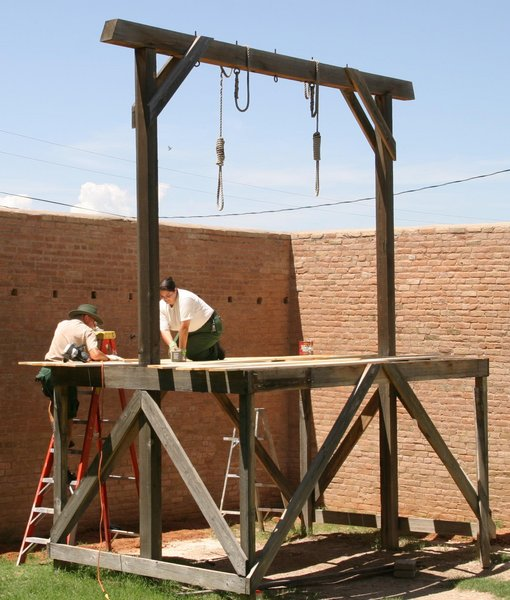
These gallows in Tombstone Courthouse State Historic Park are maintained for historical purposes by Arizona State Parks.

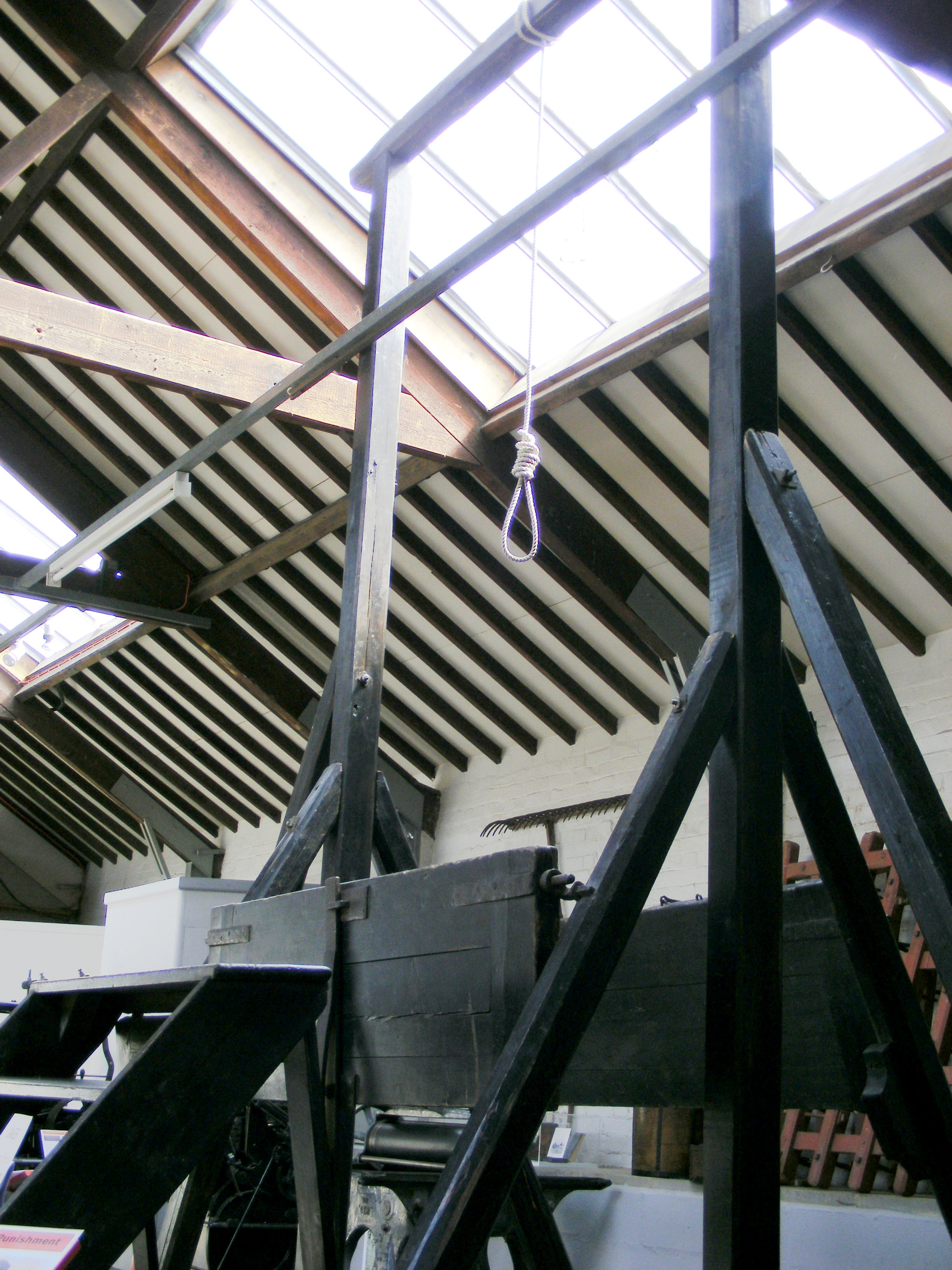
New Drop gallows in Rutland County Museum

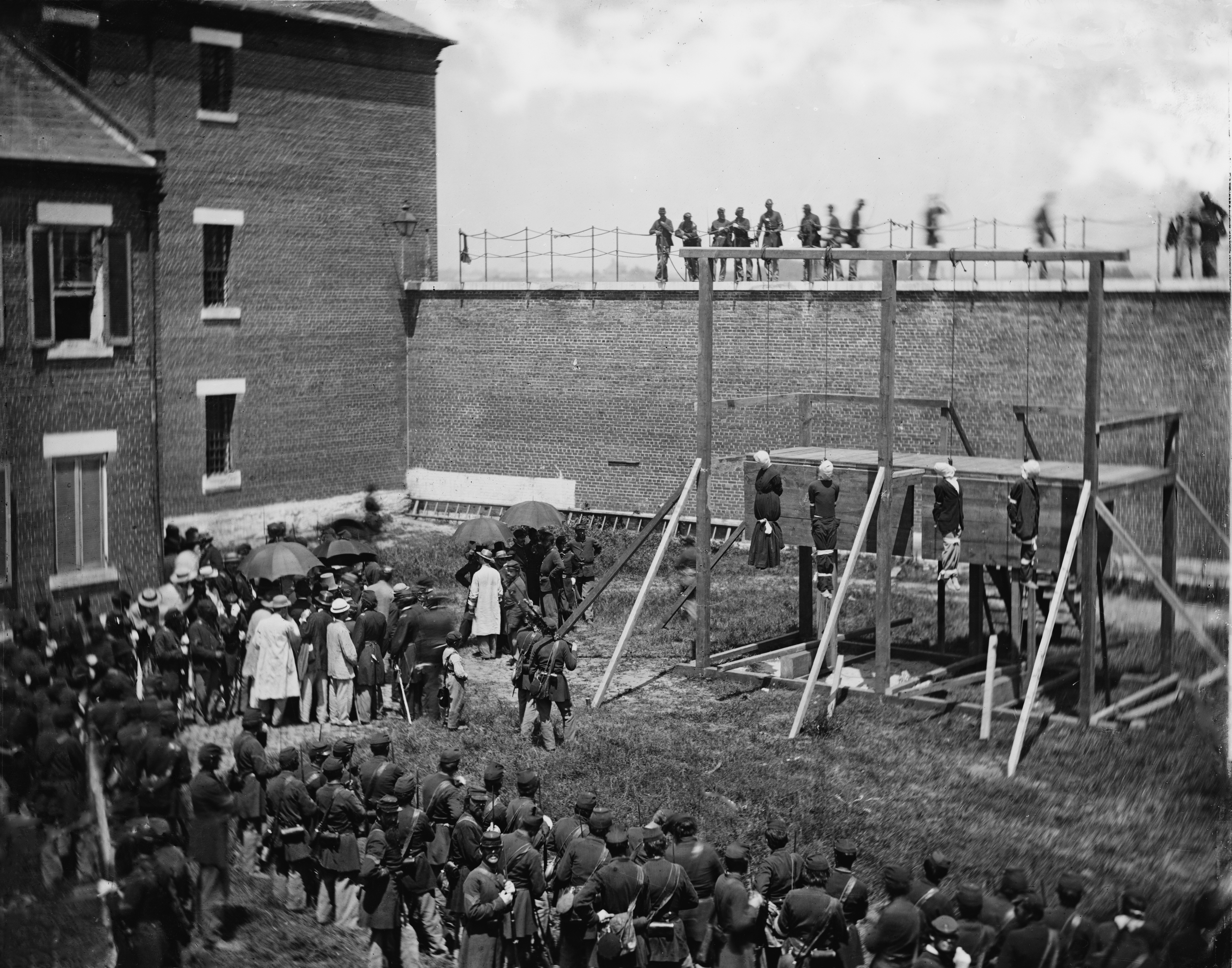
Execution of Mary Surratt, Lewis Powell, David Herold, and George Atzerodt on July 7, 1865, after trapdoor has been sprung, at Fort McNair, in Washington

A gallows (or less precisely scaffold) is a frame or elevated beam, typically wooden, from which objects can be suspended or "weighed". Gallows were thus widely used to suspend public weighing scales for large and heavy objects such as sacks of grain or minerals, usually positioned in markets or toll gates. The term was also used for a projecting framework from which a ship's anchor might be raised so it is no longer sitting on the seabed, riverbed or dock; "weighing [the] anchor" meant raising it using this apparatus while avoiding striking the ship's hull.

In modern usage the term "gallows" has come to mean almost exclusively a scaffold or gibbet used for execution by hanging.

== Etymology ==
The term "gallows" was derived from a Proto-Germanic word galgô that refers to a "pole", "rod" or "tree branch". With the beginning of Christianization, Ulfilas used the term galga in his 4th-century Gothic Testament to refer to the cross of Christ, until the use of the Latin term (crux = cross) prevailed.

== Forms of hanging ==
Gallows can take several forms:

- The simplest form (as often used in the game "Hangman") resembles an inverted "L" (or a Greek/Cyrillic "Г"), with a single upright and a horizontal beam to which the rope noose would be attached.
- The horizontal crossbeam is supported at both ends.
- The Tyburn gallows, commonly known as Tyburn Tree, was triangular in plan, with three uprights and three crossbeams, allowing up to 24 people to be executed simultaneously when all three sides were used.
- Metal eyes bolted at ceiling level, as at the Walla Walla State Penitentiary.

== Types ==
=== Permanent ===
Gallows may be permanent, partly acting as a symbol of justice. The French word for gallows, potence, stems from the Latin word potentia, meaning "power". Many old prints of European cities show such a permanent gallows erected on a prominent hill outside the walls, or more commonly near the castle or other seat of justice. In the modern era the gallows were often installed inside a prison; freestanding on a scaffold in the yard, erected at ground level over a pit, enclosed in a small shed, built into the gallery of a prison wing (with the beam resting in brackets on opposite walls), or in a purpose-built execution suite.

=== Temporary ===
Gallows can also be temporary. In some of the cases, they were even moved to the location of the crime. In England, pirates were typically executed using a temporary gallows, at low tide in the intertidal zone, then left for the sea to wash over them during the following high tides. John the Painter was hanged in 1777 from the mizzenmast of HMS Arethusa for arson in royal dockyards, the highest temporary gallows erected in British history.

The only surviving New Drop gallows in the UK is in Rutland County Museum. The gallows was portable and was set up on the gaol (jail) gatehouse roof when needed. This gallows was first used in 1813 to hang two burglars. The New Drop design was not very effective as the drop was too short to break the neck cleanly.

=== Portable ===
If a crime took place inside, gallows were sometimes erected—and the criminal hanged—at the front door. In some cases of multiple offenders it was not uncommon to erect multiple temporary gallows, with one noose per condemned criminal. In one case a condemned strangled to death in agony for forty minutes until he finally died from asphyxiation.

=== Horse and cart ===
Hanging people from early gallows sometimes involved fitting the noose around the person's neck while he or she was on a ladder or in a horse-drawn cart underneath. Removing the ladder or driving the cart away left the person dangling by the neck to slowly strangle. A noted example of this type of execution in the USA was the hanging of British spy John André in 1780.

Later, a "scaffold" with a trapdoor tended to be used, so victims dropped down and died quickly from a broken neck rather than through strangulation, especially if extra weights were fixed to their ankles.

During the era of public execution in London, England, a prominent gallows stood at Tyburn, on what is now Marble Arch. Later executions occurred outside Newgate Prison, where the Old Bailey now stands.

== Examples ==
- Gibbet of Montfaucon
- Hangman's Elm
- Triberg Gallows

== See also ==
- Capital punishment
- Dule tree
- Gibbet
- Jail tree
- Moot hill
- Patibular fork
