= Saunderson Tractor and Implement Co. =

Saunderson Tractor and Implement Company
- Company type: Private
- Industry: Automotive
- Founder: H.P. Saunderson
- Fate: Acquired
- Headquarters: Elstow, England
- Area served: UK

H P Saunderson founded his Saunderson Tractor and Implement Company in Elstow, Bedford, in 1890 after visiting Canada and seeing the Massey and Harris companies. In 1898 Saunderson demonstrated a "Self Moving Vehicle" at a trial organised at the Royal Show, which it failed to complete because of engine failure. It was priced at £250 but it is not known if any were sold. At this time it was the largest tractor company in the world, but went to be sold to a larger, vehicle manufacturing company.

== History ==
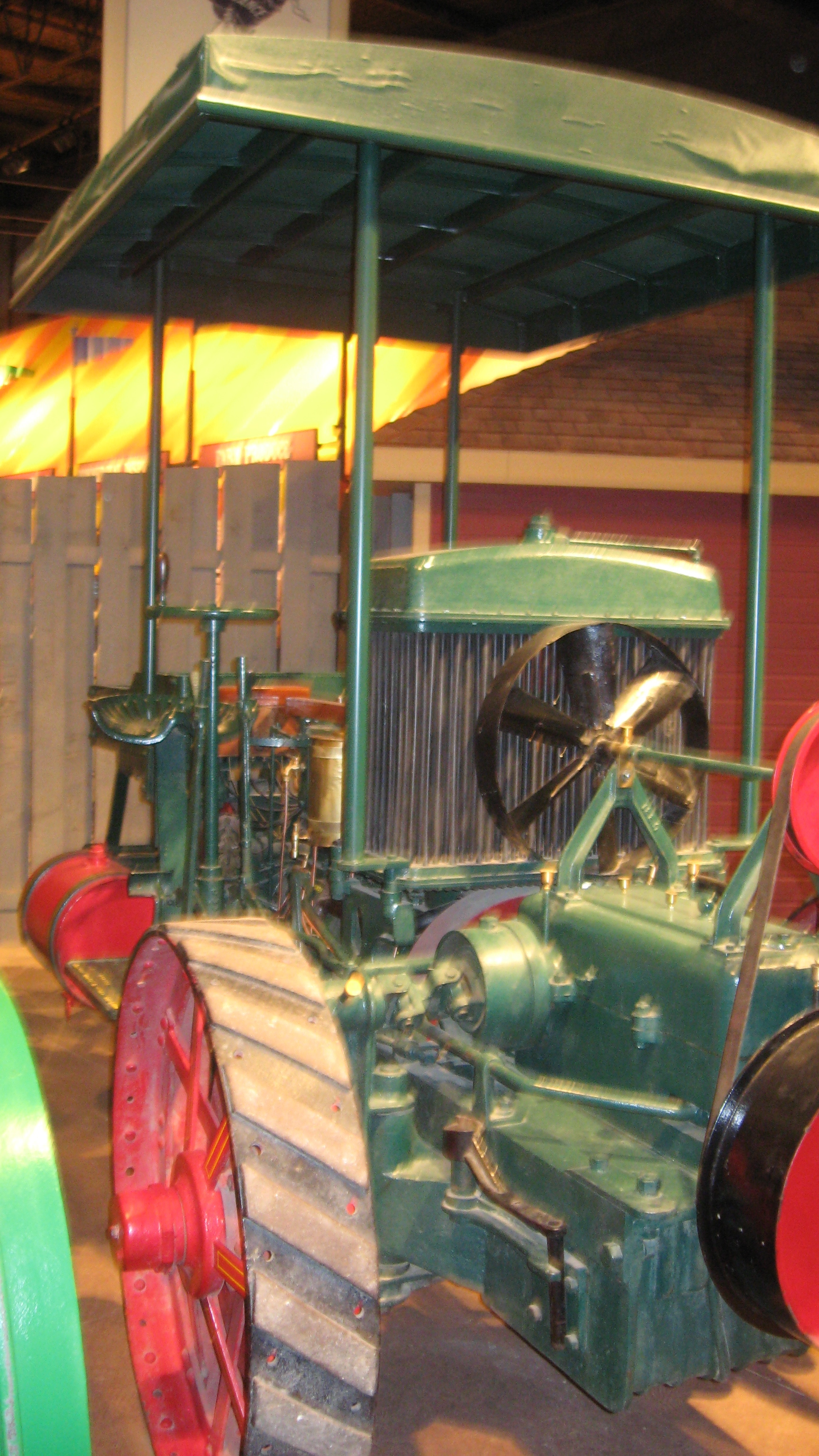
1907 three-wheel-drive petrol-fuelled 50hp Type A, as used on a Saskatchewan farm around 1910

By the early 1900s production of 3-wheeled multi-purpose tractors was proceeding and by 1910, 4-wheeled models joined the range. Some of these were powered by Crossley engines. By the start of the Great War conventional tractors were being produced just in time for the sales boom caused by the wartime labour shortage and for a short time Saunderson were Britain's biggest tractor makers. This success was not to last as the 1920s agricultural slump hit sales of all tractor manufacturers and so in 1924 Saunderson was looking for a buyer.

In 1922 they introduced a new light Tractor, this had a two-cylinder 'V'-formation petrol-paraffin engine. This was a 20 hp unit, giving 12 hp on the draw bar. the tractor had a 3-year warranty.

Crossley Brothers took over the business in 1924 putting them into competition in the vehicle business with Crossley Motors. The tractors were rebranded as Crossleys. As a result of the takeover Crossley also entered into railway locomotive building business for a year as work in hand included three petrol powered locomotives for Beswicks Limeworks of Hindlow, Derbyshire. The factory at Bedford continued in operation for many years making small stationary engines as well as agricultural machinery. It was sold in the mid-1930s and became known as the Bedford Plough and Engineering co., the factory continuing to operate until the 1970s.

== Model Range ==
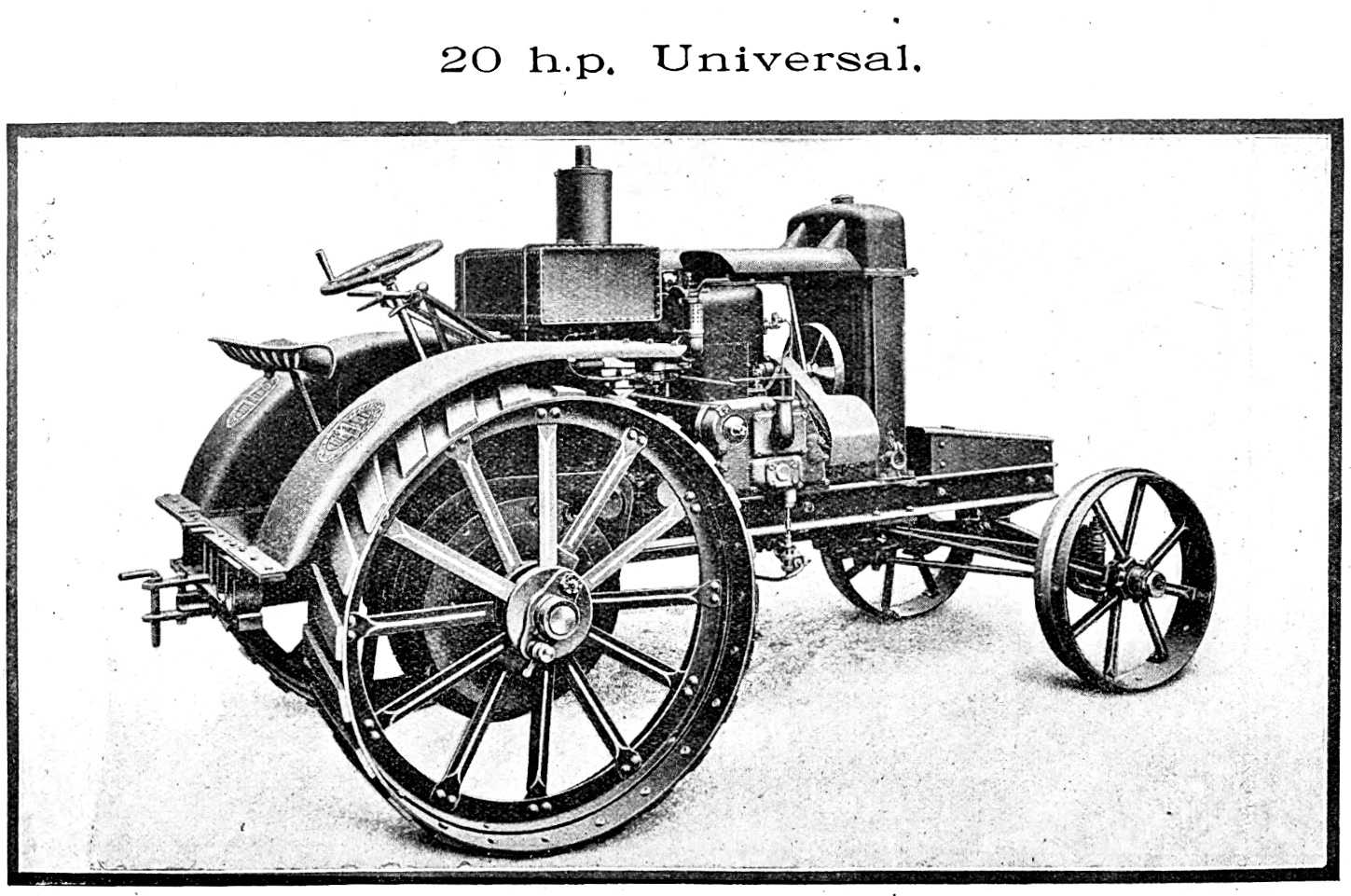
Saunderson „Universal“ light tractor 20 hp (1918-1924)

- Saunderson Model A
- Saunderson Model G
- Saunderson Light tractor
- saunderson model v 50 hp

== Surviving examples ==
A fully restored, operational Saunderson Model A three-wheeled tractor from 1906 is displayed and run at the Pioneer Settlement, Swan Hill, Victoria, Australia.

A four-wheeled model A is on display at the Western Development Museum in Saskatoon, Saskatchewan, Canada. (A large water tank, rather than a radiator is used for engine cooling.) Saunderson shipped tractor parts to an assembly plant in Regina, Saskatchewan beginning in 1907. http://wdm.ca/artifact_articles/saunderson.html

A Saunderson Model G tractor from 1914 is preserved in the Grampian Transport Museum which is situated in Alford near Aberdeen and a 1916 model is on display at Rutland County Museum in Oakham, Rutland.

A fully operational 1916 Saunderson is owned by Darren Maskell of Duck End Farm in Bedfordshire, and was featured on the BBC television program, "Escape to the Country", season 28, episode 3.

== See also ==
- Crossley – engine manufacturer
