= List of people executed in Texas, 1930–1939 =

The following is a list of people executed by the U.S. state of Texas between 1930 and 1939. During this period 122 people were executed by electrocution at the Huntsville Unit in Texas.

== Executions 1930–1939 ==
1930 – 9 executions
#	Executed person	Race	Age	Sex	Date of execution	Crime(s)	Governor
57	Bishop Adams	Black	41	M	13-Mar-1930	Robbery and Murder	Dan Moody
58	Jordan Scott	Black	30	M	22-May-1930	Murder	Dan Moody
59	William Pruitt Jr.	White	24	M	06-Jun-1930	Robbery and Murder	Dan Moody
60	Rainey Williams	Black	38	M	08-Aug-1930	Rape	Dan Moody
61	Lee Davis	Black	21	M	22-Aug-1930	Murder	Dan Moody
62	Jesse Washington	Black	21	M	12-Sep-1930	Rape and Murder	Dan Moody
63	Bill Smith	White	27	M	17-Oct-1930	Murder	Dan Moody
64	Lus Arcos	Hispanic	29	M	07-Nov-1930	Murder	Dan Moody
65	Jesse Maple	White	36	M	28-Nov-1930	Murder	Dan Moody
1931 – 10 executions
66	Gideon Twitty	White	32	M	24-Apr-1931	Rape	Ross S. Sterling
67	Ofilio Herrera	Hispanic	36	M	19-Jun-1931	Murder	Ross S. Sterling
68	Joshua Riles	Black	28	M	24-Jul-1931	Rape	Ross S. Sterling
69	Will Jenkins	Black	46	M	28-Jul-1931	Rape	Ross S. Sterling
70	Joe Shield	White	35	M	14-Aug-1931	Murder	Ross S. Sterling
71	Nicando Munoz	Hispanic	26	M	30-Oct-1931	Murder	Ross S. Sterling
72	Victor Rodriguez	Hispanic	20	M	30-Oct-1931	Murder	Ross S. Sterling
73	(Edward) Red Wing	Native American	39	M	30-Nov-1931	Rape and Murder	Ross S. Sterling
74	Will Fritts	White	39	M	18-Dec-1931	Murder	Ross S. Sterling
75	Barney Ross	Black	22	M	18-Dec-1931	Rape	Ross S. Sterling
1932 – 10 executions
76	Alfred Jackson	Black	49	M	08-Jan-1932	Murder	Ross S. Sterling
77	Joseph Ira McKee	White	32	M	08-Jan-1932	Robbery and Murder	Ross S. Sterling
78	Jake White	Black	45	M	01-Apr-1932	Robbery and Murder	Ross S. Sterling
79	James Williams	Black	28	M	20-May-1932	Murder	Ross S. Sterling
80	Earnest Johnson	Black	21	M	05-Aug-1932	Robbery and Murder	Ross S. Sterling
81	Estamistado Lopez	Hispanic	30	M	10-Jun-1932	Murder	Ross S. Sterling
82	Charlie Grogans	Black	35	M	28-Jul-1932	Rape	Ross S. Sterling
83	John Green	Black	18	M	05-Aug-1932	Robbery and Murder	Ross S. Sterling
84	Richard Brown	Black	19	M	10-Aug-1932	Murder, Rape and Robbery	Ross S. Sterling
85	Richard Johnson	Black	31	M	10-Aug-1932	Murder, Rape and Robbery	Ross S. Sterling
1933 – 9 executions
86	Walter Haskins (or Hoskins)	Black	32	M	07-Apr-1933	Murder	Miriam A. Ferguson
87	R. T. Bennett	Black	24	M	18-Aug-1933	Murder, Rape and Robbery	Miriam A. Ferguson
88	Marshall Williams	Black	24	M	20-Nov-1933	Murder	Miriam A. Ferguson
89	Pantaleon Ortiz	Hispanic	35	M	12-Dec-1933	Murder	Miriam A. Ferguson
90	Clarence Thomas	Black	19	M	15-Dec-1933	Robbery and Murder	Miriam A. Ferguson
91	Tom Cook	Black	34	M	19-Dec-1933	Rape	Miriam A. Ferguson
92	Dewey Hunt	White	27	M	29-Dec-1933	Robbery and Murder	Miriam A. Ferguson
93	Clarence Booker	Black	25	M	29-Dec-1933	Robbery and Murder	Miriam A. Ferguson
94	Carl Stewart	Black	24	M	29-Dec-1933	Robbery and Murder	Miriam A. Ferguson
1934 – 12 executions
95	Ira Kelley	White	38	M	18-Jan-1934	Rape	Miriam A. Ferguson
96	Frank Flours	Black	39	M	02-Feb-1934	Robbery and Murder	Miriam A. Ferguson
97	Thurman Burkley	Black	18	M	09-Feb-1934	Rape and Murder	Miriam A. Ferguson
98	Bluit Burkley	Black	19	M	09-Feb-1934	Rape and Murder	Miriam A. Ferguson
99	Jesse Mott	Black	34	M	09-Feb-1934	Robbery and Murder	Miriam A. Ferguson
100	Sack Jackson	Black	27	M	06-Apr-1934	Rape	Miriam A. Ferguson
101	Charlie Outlaw	White	60	M	27-Apr-1934	Robbery and Murder	Miriam A. Ferguson
102	Jonnie Williams	Black	29	M	01-May-1934	Robbery and Murder	Miriam A. Ferguson
103	Nathan Brooks	Black	29	M	01-Jun-1934	Murder	Miriam A. Ferguson
104	Ed Stanton	White	45	M	28-Sep-1934	Murder	Miriam A. Ferguson
105	Jack Jackson	Black	36	M	19-Nov-1934	Robbery and Murder	Miriam A. Ferguson
106	June Woolfolk	Black	36	M	23-Nov-1934	Murder	Miriam A. Ferguson
1935 – 20 executions
107	LaRoy Lane	White	24	M	25-Jan-1935	Murder	James V. Allred
108	Carl Dobbins	White	33	M	01-Feb-1935	Murder	James V. Allred
109	Leonard Burns	White	41	M	15-Feb-1935	Murder	James V. Allred
110	Gabe Smith Jr.	Black	24	M	19-Mar-1935	Robbery and Murder	James V. Allred
111	Ira Rector	Black	21	M	02-Apr-1935	Robbery and Murder	James V. Allred
112	Doye Arnold	White	27	M	19-Apr-1935	Murder	James V. Allred
113	Raymond Hamilton	White	20	M	10-May-1935	Murder	James V. Allred
114	Joseph Palmer	White	32	M	10-May-1935	Murder	James V. Allred
115	Albert Carr	Black	27	M	07-Jun-1935	Rape	James V. Allred
116	John B. Willis	White	42	M	12-Jun-1935	Rape and Robbery	James V. Allred
117	Elijah H. Stewart	White	28	M	12-Jun-1935	Murder	James V. Allred
118	Lewis Cernoch	White	41	M	12-Jul-1935	Murder	James V. Allred
119	John Trapper	Black	50	M	14-Aug-1935	Murder	James V. Allred
120	Johnnie Dade	Black	22	M	16-Aug-1935	Robbery and Murder	James V. Allred
121	Bernard LaCoume	White	24	M	23-Aug-1935	Robbery and Murder	James V. Allred
122	Ben Boyd	Black	24	M	30-Aug-1935	Murder	James V. Allred
123	William May Sr.	White	38	M	06-Sep-1935	Murder	James V. Allred
124	William Robert Hildreth	White	49	M	25-Nov-1935	Murder	James V. Allred
125	Pierson Cantrell	White	39	M	06-Dec-1935	Murder	James V. Allred
126	C. B. James	White	32	M	31-Dec-1935	Murder	James V. Allred
1936 – 14 executions
127	Henry Carr	Black	43	M	03-Jan-1936	Murder	James V. Allred
128	Fred Hill	Black	23	M	10-Jan-1936	Robbery and Murder	James V. Allred
129	Virgil Stalcup	White	28	M	04-May-1936	Murder	James V. Allred
130	Willie Dickerson	Black	19	M	29-May-1936	Rape	James V. Allred
131	Aria Tance	Black	29	M	30-May-1936	Robbery and Murder	James V. Allred
132	William Davis	Black	20	M	05-Jun-1936	Robbery and Murder	James V. Allred
133	James McAllister	White	37	M	05-Jun-1936	Robbery and Murder	James V. Allred
134	Juan Rivera	Hispanic	24	M	23-Jun-1936	Rape	James V. Allred
135	Grady Warren	White	25	M	10-Jul-1936	Robbery and Murder	James V. Allred
136	Mack Brown	Black	34	M	10-Jul-1936	Robbery and Murder	James V. Allred
137	Oscar Brown	Black	26	M	10-Jul-1936	Robbery and Murder	James V. Allred
138	Glenn Warren	White	33	M	20-Jul-1936	Robbery and Murder	James V. Allred
139	Antonio Carrasco	Hispanic	35	M	23-Oct-1936	Murder	James V. Allred
140	Elmo Banks	Black	43	M	23-Oct-1936	Murder	James V. Allred
1937 – 8 executions
142	Elmer Pruitt	Black	24	M	30-Apr-1937	Robbery and Murder	James V. Allred
141	Lonnie Joiner	White	38	M	28-May-1937	Murder	James V. Allred
143	Dwight Beard	White	27	M	04-Jun-1937	Robbery and Murder	James V. Allred
144	Wisie Ellison	Black	36	M	04-Jun-1937	Murder	James V. Allred
145	Clemens Matura	White	66	M	02-Jul-1937	Murder	James V. Allred
146	Earnest McCarty	White	19	M	09-Jul-1937	Rape	James V. Allred
147	George Patton	White	56	M	30-Jul-1937	Rape and Murder	James V. Allred
148	Luke Trammell	White	28	M	20-Aug-1937	Murder	James V. Allred
1938 – 18 executions
149	Albert Hemphill	Black	23	M	14-Jan-1938	Robbery and Murder	James V. Allred
150	Leroy Kelley	Black	33	M	15-Mar-1938	Murder	James V. Allred
151	Virgil Terrill	Black	25	M	01-Apr-1938	Rape	James V. Allred
152	Johnnie Banks	Black	25	M	29-Apr-1938	Murder	James V. Allred
153	John Vaughn	White	32	M	30-Apr-1938	Murder	James V. Allred
154	Roscoe Young	Black	17	M	06-May-1938	Robbery	James V. Allred
155	Henderson Young	Black	15	M	06-May-1938	Rape	James V. Allred
156	Paul Layes	White	34	M	10-May-1938	Robbery and Murder	James V. Allred
157	Charlie Brooks	Black	41	M	31-May-1938	Murder	James V. Allred
158	Tommie Moore	Black	26	M	03-Jun-1938	Murder	James V. Allred
159	Mark Calhoun	Black	18	M	17-Jun-1938	Rape	James V. Allred
160	Tommie Wells	Black	24	M	17-Jun-1938	Rape	James V. Allred
161	Fobie Grays	Black	22	M	20-Jul-1938	Murder	James V. Allred
162	Vince Boss	White	22	M	02-Aug-1938	Robbery and Murder	James V. Allred
163	Callan Morgan	White	37	M	19-Aug-1938	Murder	James V. Allred
164	Jesus Polanco	Hispanic	22	M	19-Aug-1938	Murder	James V. Allred
165	Salenes Canedo	Hispanic	26	M	28-Oct-1938	Robbery and Murder	James V. Allred
166	Morris Norman	Black	20	M	16-Dec-1938	Rape	James V. Allred
1939 – 12 executions
167	Winzell Williams	Black	18	M	06-Mar-1939	Robbery and Murder	W. Lee O'Daniel
168	Harvey Nealy	Black	19	M	10-Apr-1939	Murder	W. Lee O'Daniel
169	Jesus Herrera	Hispanic	48	M	15-Apr-1939	Rape and Murder	W. Lee O'Daniel
170	Genaro Lugo	Hispanic	23	M	23-Apr-1939	Murder	W. Lee O'Daniel
171	James Miles	Black	22	M	23-Apr-1939	Rape and Robbery	W. Lee O'Daniel
172	Bennie Randall	Black	20	M	07-May-1939	Rape	W. Lee O'Daniel
173	James Ervin	Black	38	M	19-May-1939	Rape	W. Lee O'Daniel
174	Johnnie Caesar	Black	30	M	21-May-1939	Murder	W. Lee O'Daniel
175	Ladell Rhodes	Black	26	M	26-Jun-1939	Murder	W. Lee O'Daniel
176	Rafe Walker	Black	32	M	30-Jun-1939	Rape	W. Lee O'Daniel
177	Frank Salazar	Hispanic	24	M	16-Dec-1939	Murder	W. Lee O'Daniel
178	Harry Lacy	Black	42	M	19-Dec-1939	Murder	W. Lee O'Daniel
Sources: List of electrocuted offenders by the TDJC, and The Espy File: 1608–2002.

Preceded by List of people executed in Texas, 1920–1929	Lists of people executed in Texas	Succeeded by List of people executed in Texas, 1940–1949

== See also ==
- Capital punishment in Texas
