= List of people executed in Texas, 1960–1964 =

The following is a list of people executed by the U.S. state of Texas between 1960 and 1964. During this period 29 people were executed by electrocution at the Huntsville Unit in Texas.

Joseph Johnson became the last person in Texas to be executed by the electric chair on July 30, 1964. In addition, James Echols became the last person in Texas to be executed for a crime other than murder (for participating in a gang rape, on May 7, 1964). It would be 18 years before the next execution took place in Texas; all subsequent executions have been for murder. Echols was also the last juvenile offender to be executed in the United States prior to Furman v. Georgia. No other juvenile offenders would be executed in the United States until Charles Rumbaugh in 1985.

== Executions 1960–1964 ==
1960 – 8 executions
#	Executed person	Race	Age	Sex	Date of execution	Crime(s)	Governor
333	Junior Williams	Black	30	M	05-Mar-1960	Rape	Price Daniel
334	Nearvel Moon	White	19	M	28-Apr-1960	Murder-Robbery	Price Daniel
335	Howard Draper Jr.	Black	28	M	26-May-1960	Rape	Price Daniel
336	George William (or Williams)	Black	30	M	08-Jul-1960	Murder-Robbery	Price Daniel
337	Willie Philpot	Black	27	M	15-Jul-1960	Murder-Rape	Price Daniel
338	George Moses	Black	30	M	12-Aug-1960	Murder	Price Daniel
339	Eusebio Martinez	Hispanic	26	M	27-Aug-1960	Murder-Rape	Price Daniel
340	Samuel Holmes	Black	22	M	30-Nov-1960	Rape-Burglary	Price Daniel
1961 – 3 executions							Price Daniel
341	Charles Williams	Black	20	M	03-Jun-1961	Rape	Price Daniel
342	James Edwards	Black	30	M	23-Jun-1961	Rape-Kidnapping	Price Daniel
343	Fred Leath	White	40	M	09-Nov-1961	Murder	Price Daniel
1962 – 9 executions							Price Daniel
344	Charles Forgey	White	23	M	10-Jan-1962	Rape	Price Daniel
345	Roosevelt Wiley	Black	29	M	11-Jan-1962	Murder-Robbery	Price Daniel
346	Donald Wilson	White	22	M	20-Mar-1962	Murder-Robbery	Price Daniel
347	Adrian Johnson	Black	19	M	19-Apr-1962	Murder-Rape	Price Daniel
348	Herbert Bradley	Black	20	M	15-May-1962	Robbery	Price Daniel
349	Howard Stickney	White	24	M	23-May-1962	Murder	Price Daniel
350	Walter Mosley	White	26	M	18-Jul-1962	Murder	Price Daniel
351	Bobby Stein	Black	29	M	05-Sep-1962	Murder-Robbery	Price Daniel
352	Roscoe Gibson	Black	39	M	06-Oct-1962	Rape-Burglary	Price Daniel
1963 – 4 executions							Price Daniel
353	Joe Sneed	Black	29	M	03-Jan-1963	Rape	Price Daniel
354	Bennie McIntyre	Black	20	M	20-Jan-1963	Rape	John Connally
355	Leo Luton	White	34	M	20-Feb-1963	Murder-Robbery	John Connally
356	John Lavan Jr.	Black	34	M	31-Mar-1963	Murder-Robbery-Burglary	John Connally
1964 – 5 executions							John Connally
357	Jesse Parker	Black	23	M	12-Feb-1964	Rape-Kidnapping	John Connally
358	Bobby Bradford	Black	32	M	11-Mar-1964	Murder	John Connally
359	Lawrence O'Connor	Black	26	M	26-Apr-1964	Rape-Robbery	John Connally
360	James Echols	Black	19	M	07-May-1964	Rape-Robbery	John Connally
361	Joseph Johnson Jr.	Black	30	M	30-Jul-1964	Murder	John Connally
Sources: List of electrocuted offenders by the TDJC, and The Espy File: 1608–2002.

Preceded by List of people executed in Texas, 1950–1959	Lists of people executed in Texas	Succeeded by List of people executed in Texas, 1982–1989

== See also ==
- Capital punishment in Texas
