= List of people executed in Texas, 1940–1949 =

The following is a list of people executed by the U.S. state of Texas between 1940 and 1949. During this period 78 people were executed by electrocution at the Huntsville Unit in Texas.

== Executions 1940–1949 ==
1940 – 8 executions
#	Executed person	Race	Age	Sex	Date of execution	Crime(s)	Governor
179	J.W. Rickman	White	22	M	18-Mar-1940	Murder	W. Lee O'Daniel
180	Bluitt Hampton	Black	28	M	31-Mar-1940	Murder	W. Lee O'Daniel
181	Robert Walker	White	25	M	19-Apr-1940	Robbery and Murder	W. Lee O'Daniel
182	Webster Lyons	Black	29	M	28-Apr-1940	Robbery and Murder	W. Lee O'Daniel
183	Robert Manning	Black	20	M	28-Apr-1940	Robbery and Murder	W. Lee O'Daniel
184	Burton Franks	White	22	M	07-Jun-1940	Robbery and Murder	W. Lee O'Daniel
185	Placido Handy	Hispanic	36	M	09-Jun-1940	Rape and Murder	W. Lee O'Daniel
186	Florence Murphy	Black	31	M	30-Aug-1940	Rape	W. Lee O'Daniel
1941 – 6 executions
187	Ascension Martinez	Hispanic	37	M	21-Feb-1941	Rape and Murder	W. Lee O'Daniel
188	Theodia Muldrow	Black	19	M	21-Feb-1941	Rape	W. Lee O'Daniel
189	George Griffin	Black	26	M	20-Apr-1941	Rape	W. Lee O'Daniel
190	Tommie Harris	Black	20	M	06-Jun-1941	Rape and Murder	W. Lee O'Daniel
191	Arlin Reese	White	46	M	24-Aug-1941	Murder	Coke R. Stevenson
192	Albert Wesley, Jr.	Black	19	M	28-Dec-1941	Rape	Coke R. Stevenson
1942 – 12 executions
193	Charlie Goldsby	Black	37	M	22-Jan-1942	Rape	Coke R. Stevenson
194	Nehemiah Glover	Black	28	M	28-Jan-1942	Murder, Rape and Robbery	Coke R. Stevenson
195	Richard Robinson	Black	38	M	15-Feb-1942	Murder	Coke R. Stevenson
196	Rogers King	Black	19	M	22-Mar-1942	Robbery and Murder	Coke R. Stevenson
197	James Alford	White	26	M	08-May-1942	Robbery and Murder	Coke R. Stevenson
198	McKinley Morris	Black	33	M	16-May-1942	Robbery and Murder	Coke R. Stevenson
199	Orrin Brown	White	55	M	15-Jun-1942	Murder	Coke R. Stevenson
200	Luther Hill	Black	29	M	05-Jul-1942	Murder	Coke R. Stevenson
201	Edward Hart, Jr.	Black	25	M	29-Jul-1942	Rape and Robbery	Coke R. Stevenson
202	Ben Walker	Black	35	M	01-Aug-1942	Rape	Coke R. Stevenson
203	Emeliano Benavidez	Hispanic	31	M	08-Aug-1942	Murder	Coke R. Stevenson
204	C. L. Turner	Black	36	M	02-Sep-1942	Murder	Coke R. Stevenson
1943 – 4 executions
205	Leo Lera	White	33	M	19-Feb-1943	Murder	Coke R. Stevenson
206	Arthur Wilson	Black	24	M	21-Jul-1943	Robbery and Murder	Coke R. Stevenson
207	Rex Beard, Jr.	White	20	M	03-Sep-1943	Murder	Coke R. Stevenson
208	Delores Quiroz	White	31	M	29-Oct-1943	Murder	Coke R. Stevenson
1944 – 9 executions
209	Bruce Jordan	White	25	M	16-Apr-1944	Robbery and Murder	Coke R. Stevenson
210	Juan Gutierrez	Hispanic	42	M	02-May-1944	Murder	Coke R. Stevenson
211	David Williams	Black	19	M	09-Jul-1944	Rape	Coke R. Stevenson
212	Bennie Johnson	Black	41	M	09-Jul-1944	Robbery and Murder	Coke R. Stevenson
213	Clay Whittle	White	37	M	30-Jul-1944	Murder	Coke R. Stevenson
214	Willie Johnson	Black	36	M	27-Aug-1944	Murder	Coke R. Stevenson
215	George Johnson	Black	30	M	27-Aug-1944	Murder	Coke R. Stevenson
216	J. B. Stephens	White	37	M	19-Dec-1944	Murder	Coke R. Stevenson
217	Allen Murray	Black	32	M	31-Dec-1944	Rape	Coke R. Stevenson
1945 – 4 executions
218	Henry Williams	Black	58	M	04-Mar-1945	Murder	Coke R. Stevenson
219	Robert Holloway	Black	23	M	25-Mar-1945	Robbery and Murder	Coke R. Stevenson
220	Julius Harper	Black	18	M	07-Jul-1945	Robbery and Murder	Coke R. Stevenson
221	Joseph Ogelsby	Black	21	M	02-Sep-1945	Rape	Coke R. Stevenson
1946 – 6 executions
222	Jarvin Elliott	Black	23	M	18-Jan-1946	Murder	Coke R. Stevenson
223	Clyde Moore	Black	21	M	08-May-1946	Rape	Coke R. Stevenson
224	Richard Gamble	Black	32	M	28-Jun-1946	Murder, Rape and Robbery	Coke R. Stevenson
225	L. C. Newman	Black	26	M	19-Jul-1946	Murder	Coke R. Stevenson
226	Joe Leza	Hispanic	31	M	01-Sep-1946	Murder and Burglary	Coke R. Stevenson
227	Harold Palm	Black	35	M	01-Sep-1946	Rape	Coke R. Stevenson
1947 – 10 executions
228	L. D. Henderson	Black	21	M	21-Mar-1947	Murder	Beauford H. Jester
229	P. H. Zachary	Black	27	M	01-Apr-1947	Murder	Beauford H. Jester
230	Huey Wilson	Black	36	M	02-May-1947	Rape and Robbery	Beauford H. Jester
231	Oscar Allen	Black	45	M	29-May-1947	Robbery and Murder	Beauford H. Jester
232	Louis Jones	Black	30	M	02-Jun-1947	Robbery and Murder	Beauford H. Jester
233	William Norris	Black	23	M	07-Jun-1947	Murder	Beauford H. Jester
234	Charlie Allen	Black	37	M	26-Jun-1947	Robbery and Murder	Beauford H. Jester
235	Arthur Adams	Black	38	M	05-Sep-1947	Murder	Beauford H. Jester
236	Elijah Pearson	Black	46	M	12-Sep-1947	Robbery and Murder	Beauford H. Jester
237	Raymond Davis	Black	17	M	05-Oct-1947	Murder	Beauford H. Jester
1948 – 11 executions
238	Lonnie Cline	White	28	M	02-Jan-1948	Murder	Beauford H. Jester
239	Nolan West	White	25	M	04-Feb-1948	Robbery and Murder	Beauford H. Jester
240	Bennie Johnson	Black	25	M	28-Mar-1948	Rape	Beauford H. Jester
241	Clayton Rushing	White	26	M	28-Mar-1948	Robbery and Murder	Beauford H. Jester
242	Willie Sims	Black	36	M	25-Apr-1948	Rape	Beauford H. Jester
243	Joseph Saulter	White	33	M	09-Jul-1948	Murder	Beauford H. Jester
244	John Coleman	Black	57	M	18-Jul-1948	Rape	Beauford H. Jester
245	Henry Brown	Black	23	M	01-Aug-1948	Murder	Beauford H. Jester
246	Riley McCane	White	43	M	20-Aug-1948	Murder	Beauford H. Jester
247	Cleo Smith	Black	29	M	24-Aug-1948	Rape	Beauford H. Jester
248	Andrew Hill	Black	23	M	03-Oct-1948	Murder	Beauford H. Jester
1949 – 8 executions
249	Wilson Moore	Black	29	M	01-Feb-1949	Rape	Beauford H. Jester
250	Thurman Williams	Black	23	M	13-Feb-1949	Robbery and Murder	Beauford H. Jester
251	Thomas Larkin	Black	23	M	21-Feb-1949	Robbery and Murder	Beauford H. Jester
252	Buster Northern	White	20	M	16-Apr-1949	Robbery and Murder	Beauford H. Jester
253	W. (or Fred) Jones	White	40	M	10-Aug-1949	Murder	Allan Shivers
254	General Kerzee	Black	53	M	10-Aug-1949	Murder	Allan Shivers
255	F. M. McClendon	Black	23	M	14-Aug-1949	Murder	Allan Shivers
256	Cleveland Stovall, Jr.	Black	22	M	11-Sep-1949	Rape	Allan Shivers
Sources: List of electrocuted offenders by the TDJC, and The Espy File: 1608–2002.

Preceded by List of people executed in Texas, 1930–1939	Lists of people executed in Texas	Succeeded by List of people executed in Texas, 1950–1959

== See also ==
- Capital punishment in Texas
