= List of people executed in Texas, 1819–1849 =

The following is a list of people executed in Texas between 1819 and 1849. There were nine known executions during this period. All of the people were executed by hanging.

== Executions 1819–1849 ==
Under the Spanish Province of Texas – 1 execution
#	Executed person	Race	Age	Sex	Date of execution	Crime(s)	President/Governor
1	George Brown	White	–	M	November 1819	Piracy	Antonio María Martínez
Under the Mexican State of Coahuila y Tejas – 1 execution
2	Joseph Clayton	unknown	–	M	July 1834	Murder	Juan José Elguézabal
Under the Republic of Texas – 6 executions
3	John Quick	White	–	M	28-Mar-1838	Murder	Sam Houston
4	David Jones	White	–	M	28-Mar-1838	Murder	Sam Houston
5	Michael Campbell	White	–	M	28-Apr-1838	Murder	Sam Houston
6	Henry Forbes	Black	–	M	13-Nov-1840	Burglary and jail-breaking	Mirabeau B. Lamar
7	Charles Henniker	White	–	M	08-Dec-1843	Robbery and Murder	Sam Houston
8	William Williams	White	–	M	08-May-1844	Murder	Sam Houston
Under the U.S. state of Texas – 1 execution
9	Jesse (Grinder)	Black	–	M	30-Nov-1846	Murder	James Pinckney Henderson
Source: The Espy File: 1608–2002.

Preceded by No record of executions in Texas prior to 1819	Lists of people executed in Texas	Succeeded by List of people executed in Texas, 1850–1859

== See also ==
- Capital punishment in the United States
