= List of people executed in Texas, 1860–1869 =

The following is a list of people executed by the U.S. state of Texas between 1860 and 1869. During this period a total of 20 people were executed: 16 by hanging and 4 by firing squad.

== Executions 1860–1869 ==
1860 – 2 executions
#	Executed person	Race	Age	Sex	Date of execution	Crime(s)	Governor
28	William Hinton	White	–	M	25-Mar-1860	Murder	Sam Houston
29	Pitman	unknown	–	M	1860	Unknown	Sam Houston
1862 – 6 executions
30	(Lount)	Black	–	M	25-Jul-1862	Robbery and Murder	Francis Lubbock
31	John Conn	White	–	M	1862	Treason	Francis Lubbock
32	Ira Burdick	White	–	M	1862	Treason	Francis Lubbock
33	Jim McKinn	White	–	M	1862	Treason	Francis Lubbock
34	Parson Maples	White	–	M	1862	Treason	Francis Lubbock
35	Ward	White	–	M	1862	Treason	Francis Lubbock
1863 – 3 executions (2 by firing squad and 1 by hanging)
36	Nicaragua Smith (by firing squad)	White	–	M	January 1863	Desertion	Francis Lubbock
37	Chipita Rodriguez (by hanging)	Hispanic	–	F	13-Nov-1863	Robbery and Murder	Pendleton Murrah
38	Pess White (by firing squad)	Black	30	M	1863	Attempted Rape	Pendleton Murrah
1864 – 3 executions (2 by firing squad and 1 by hanging)
39	E. Hempel (by hanging)	White	–	M	30-Apr-1864	Murder	Pendleton Murrah
40	E. P. Allen (by firing squad)	White	–	M	August 1864	Desertion	Pendleton Murrah
41	(Name not known) (by firing squad)	White	–	M	1864	Desertion	Pendleton Murrah
1867 – 1 execution
42	Johnson	Black	–	M	1867	Murder	Elisha M. Pease
1868 – 1 execution
43	Joe Williams	Black	–	M	18-Dec-1868	Robbery and Murder	Elisha M. Pease
1869 – 4 executions
44	William Blackmore	White	–	M	02-Apr-1869	Robbery and Murder	Elisha M. Pease
45	John Thompson	White	–	M	02-Apr-1869	Robbery and Murder	Elisha M. Pease
46	Clark Jones	unknown	–	M	13-Aug-1869	Murder	Elisha M. Pease
47	Dennis Nelson	unknown	–	M	13-Aug-1869	Murder	Elisha M. Pease
Source: The Espy File: 1608–2002.

Preceded by List of people executed in Texas, 1850–1859	Lists of people executed in Texas	Succeeded by List of people executed in Texas, 1870–1879

== See also ==
- Capital punishment in the United States
