= List of people executed in Texas, 1880–1889 =

The following is a list of people executed by the U.S. state of Texas between 1880 and 1889. During this period 64 people were executed by hanging.

== Executions 1880–1889 ==
1880 – 13 executions
| # | Executed person | Race | Age | Sex | Date of execution | Crime(s) | Governor |
|---|---|---|---|---|---|---|---|
| 98 | Samuel Houston Myers | White | – | M | 19-Mar-1880 | Murder | Oran Milo Roberts |
| 99 | John Henry | unknown | – | M | 26-Mar-1880 | Murder | Oran Milo Roberts |
| 100 | Allen Towles | Black | – | M | 26-Mar-1880 | Murder | Oran Milo Roberts |
| 101 | Bill Walker | Black | – | M | 16-Apr-1880 | Murder | Oran Milo Roberts |
| 102 | Lucius Noftsinger | White | 30 | M | 30-Apr-1880 | Murder | Oran Milo Roberts |
| 103 | Isham Capps | Black | 30 | M | 07-May-1880 | Rape | Oran Milo Roberts |
| 104 | Henry Quarles | Black | 30 | M | 11-Jun-1880 | Murder | Oran Milo Roberts |
| 105 | Sam Howard | unknown | – | M | 18-Jun-1880 | Murder | Oran Milo Roberts |
| 106 | English Carter | White | – | M | 02-Jul-1880 | Murder | Oran Milo Roberts |
| 107 | George Doren | White | 30 | M | 20-Aug-1880 | Murder | Oran Milo Roberts |
| 108 | Allen Wright | Black | 28 | M | 27-Aug-1880 | Murder | Oran Milo Roberts |
| 109 | Lyncefield Burk | White | 41 | M | 27-Aug-1880 | Rape | Oran Milo Roberts |
| 110 | Warren Sheppard | Black | – | M | 12-Nov-1880 | Murder | Oran Milo Roberts |
1881 – 4 executions
| 111 | Adam Thompson | Black | 26 | M | 01-Jul-1881 | Robbery and Murder | Oran Milo Roberts |
| 112 | Isaiah Walker | Black | – | M | 28-Jul-1881 | Murder | Oran Milo Roberts |
| 113 | Tom Williams | Black | 21 | M | 23-Sep-1881 | Murder | Oran Milo Roberts |
| 114 | Jack Post | White | 29 | M | 28-Oct-1881 | Robbery and Murder | Oran Milo Roberts |
1882 – 6 executions
| 115 | D. C. White | White | – | M | 02-Feb-1882 | Robbery and Murder | Oran Milo Roberts |
| 116 | Miles Thompson | Black | 21 | M | 17-Feb-1882 | Rape and Murder | Oran Milo Roberts |
| 117 | Quirius Gaitan | Hispanic | – | M | 09-Jun-1882 | Murder | Oran Milo Roberts |
| 118 | Chess Thomas | Black | – | M | 11-Aug-1882 | Murder | Oran Milo Roberts |
| 119 | Shack Caldwell | Black | 20 | M | 18-Aug-1882 | Murder | Oran Milo Roberts |
| 120 | Charles Ward | Black | 34 | M | 21-Aug-1882 | Rape | Oran Milo Roberts |
1883 – 8 executions
| 121 | Isham Scott | Black | – | M | 05-Jan-1883 | Murder | Oran Milo Roberts |
| 122 | Fred Waite | White | 22 | M | 23-Mar-1883 | Murder | John Ireland |
| 123 | Wyatt Banks | Black | 25 | M | 23-Apr-1883 | Murder | John Ireland |
| 124 | Joseph Brewster | White | – | M | 05-Jul-1883 | Rape | John Ireland |
| 125 | John Cone | Black | 28 | M | 06-Jul-1883 | Rape | John Ireland |
| 126 | James Stanley | Black | – | M | 19-Oct-1883 | Robbery and Murder | John Ireland |
| 127 | Juan Duran | Hispanic | – | M | 14-Dec-1883 | Robbery and Murder | John Ireland |
| 128 | James Taylor | Black | 21 | M | 21-Dec-1883 | Murder | John Ireland |
1884 – 3 executions
| 129 | Harrison Williams | Black | 28 | M | 07-Mar-1884 | Murder | John Ireland |
| 130 | Refugio Gomez | Black | 28 | M | 06-Jun-1884 | Murder | John Ireland |
| 131 | Bill Bass | Black | 25 | M | 31-Oct-1884 | Rape | John Ireland |
| 1885 – 6 executions | | | | | | | John Ireland |
| 132 | Anthony Walker | Black | 36 | M | 23-Jan-1885 | Murder | John Ireland |
| 133 | Jasper Rhodes | Black | 22 | M | 22-May-1885 | Murder | John Ireland |
| 134 | Archie Gibson | Black | 35 | M | 29-May-1885 | Murder | John Ireland |
| 135 | Christino Aldava | Hispanic | 26 | M | 14-Aug-1885 | Murder | John Ireland |
| 136 | Caledonio Chivarria | Hispanic | 23 | M | 14-Aug-1885 | Robbery and Murder | John Ireland |
| 137 | Henry Johnson | Black | 40 | M | 14-Nov-1885 | Rape and Murder | John Ireland |
1886 – 7 executions
| 138 | Bill Madison | Black | 24 | M | 15-Jan-1886 | Murder | John Ireland |
| 139 | Jose Mendiola | Hispanic | 30 | M | 15-Jan-1886 | Murder | John Ireland |
| 140 | Ben Lane | White | 26 | M | 19-Mar-1886 | Murder | John Ireland |
| 141 | Wash Washington | Black | 30 | M | 31-Mar-1886 | Murder | John Ireland |
| 142 | Camillio Gonzales | Hispanic | – | M | 17-Apr-1886 | Robbery and Murder | John Ireland |
| 143 | George Young | Black | 31 | M | 08-May-1886 | Murder | John Ireland |
| 144 | Irvine Murray | Black | – | M | 10-Sep-1886 | Murder | John Ireland |
1887 – 4 executions
| 145 | James Jones | Black | 27 | M | 13-May-1887 | Murder | Lawrence Sullivan Ross |
| 146 | Robert Giles | Black | – | M | 14-Oct-1887 | Robbery and Murder | Lawrence Sullivan Ross |
| 147 | Hamp Wade | Black | – | M | 15-Oct-1887 | Murder | Lawrence Sullivan Ross |
| 148 | Cruz Rodriguez | Hispanic | – | M | 09-Dec-1887 | Murder | Lawrence Sullivan Ross |
1888 – 9 executions
| 149 | Chillers Banks | Black | 28 | M | 13-Apr-1888 | Murder | Lawrence Sullivan Ross |
| 150 | William Roe | White | 31 | M | 26-May-1888 | Murder | Lawrence Sullivan Ross |
| 151 | Conrad Jackson | Black | 20 | M | 16-Jul-1888 | Murder | Lawrence Sullivan Ross |
| 152 | Burke Mitchell | Black | 36 | M | 31-Aug-1888 | Murder | Lawrence Sullivan Ross |
| 153 | Westley Williams | Black | 40 | M | 29-Sep-1888 | Murder | Lawrence Sullivan Ross |
| 154 | William Washington | Black | – | M | 20-Oct-1888 | Murder, Rape and Robbery | Lawrence Sullivan Ross |
| 155 | Casimero Livar | Hispanic | – | M | 07-Dec-1888 | Murder | Lawrence Sullivan Ross |
| 156 | John Johnson | Black | 17 | M | 21-Dec-1888 | Rape | Lawrence Sullivan Ross |
| 157 | Joe Rather | Black | – | M | 28-Dec-1888 | Murder | Lawrence Sullivan Ross |
1889 – 4 executions
| 158 | Charles McGill | Black | 35 | M | 25-Jan-1889 | Murder | Lawrence Sullivan Ross |
| 159 | George Walker | Black | – | M | 05-Apr-1889 | Murder | Lawrence Sullivan Ross |
| 160 | James McCoy | White | 32 | M | 23-Aug-1889 | Murder | Lawrence Sullivan Ross |
| 161 | Demeiro Fierro | Hispanic | – | M | 01-Nov-1889 | Murder | Lawrence Sullivan Ross |
Source: The Espy File: 1608–2002.

| Preceded by List of people executed in Texas, 1870–1879 | Lists of people executed in Texas | Succeeded by List of people executed in Texas, 1890–1899 |

== See also ==
- Capital punishment in Texas
