= List of people executed in Texas, 1890–1899 =

The following is a list of people executed in the U.S. state of Texas between 1890 and 1899. During this period 101 people were executed by hanging, 92 by Texas and nine by the federal government.

== Executions 1890–1899 ==
Federal execution

1890 – 3 executions
| # | Executed person | Race | Age | Sex | Date of execution | Crime(s) | Governor |
|---|---|---|---|---|---|---|---|
| 162 | Fletcher Holden | Black | – | M | 06-Jun-1890 | Robbery and Murder | Lawrence Sullivan Ross |
| 163 | Henry Holden | Black | – | M | 06-Jun-1890 | Robbery and Murder | Lawrence Sullivan Ross |
| 164 | Tom Miles | Black | – | M | 06-Jun-1890 | Robbery and Murder | Lawrence Sullivan Ross |
1891 – 14 executions
| 165 | Jace Murphy | Black | – | M | 09-Jan-1891 | Murder | Lawrence Sullivan Ross |
| 166 | Will Blackwell | Black | 20 | M | 06-Mar-1891 | Robbery and Murder | Jim Hogg |
| 167 | Joe Lewis | Black | 37 | M | 27-Mar-1891 | Murder | Jim Hogg |
| 168 | Henry Johnson | White | 25 | M | 08-Jun-1891 | Robbery and Murder | Jim Hogg |
| 169 | William Caldwell | Black | 26 | M | 31-Jul-1891 | Murder | Jim Hogg |
| 170 | Richard Duncan | White | 29 | M | 18-Sep-1891 | Robbery and Murder | Jim Hogg |
| 171 | Jim Leeper | White | – | M | 29-Sep-1891 | Robbery and Murder | Jim Hogg |
| 172 | Ed Powell | White | – | M | 29-Sep-1891 | Robbery and Murder | Jim Hogg |
| 173 | John Felder | Black | – | M | 09-Oct-1891 | Murder | Jim Hogg |
| 174 | Wade Felder | Black | – | M | 09-Oct-1891 | Murder | Jim Hogg |
| 175 | Lee Hughes | Black | 24 | M | 30-Oct-1891 | Murder | Jim Hogg |
| 176 | William Frizzell | White | 27 | M | 20-Nov-1891 | Murder | Jim Hogg |
| 177 | Lorenzo Porez | Hispanic | – | M | 27-Nov-1891 | Murder | Jim Hogg |
| 178 | Jose Mendez | Hispanic | – | M | 10-Dec-1891 | Murder | Jim Hogg |
1892 – 12 executions
| 179 | George Scott | Black | 23 | M | 27-May-1892 | Murder | Jim Hogg |
| 180 | James Fisher | White | 33 | M | 27-May-1892 | Murder | Jim Hogg |
| 181 | Tobe Cook | Black | 37 | M | 10-Jun-1892 | Rape and Murder | Jim Hogg |
| 182 | Alfred White | Black | 50 | M | 11-Jun-1892 | Murder | Jim Hogg |
| 183 | King Sims | Black | – | M | 24-Jun-1892 | Murder | Jim Hogg |
| 184 | George Smith | White | – | M | 08-Jul-1892 | Robbery and Murder | Jim Hogg |
| 185 | Cal Parks | Black | 21 | M | 15-Jul-1892 | Rape and Murder | Jim Hogg |
| 186 | Archie Washington | Black | 21 | M | 26-Jul-1892 | Murder | Jim Hogg |
| 187 | Henry McGee | Black | – | M | 12-Aug-1892 | Murder | Jim Hogg |
| 188 | Buck Wilkerson | Black | 24 | M | 14-Oct-1892 | Murder | Jim Hogg |
| 189 | Rosalie Castillo | Hispanic | – | M | 25-Nov-1892 | Rape | Jim Hogg |
| 190 | George Freeny | Black | 50 | M | 25-Nov-1892 | Murder | Jim Hogg |
1893 – 13 executions
| 191 | Frank Holland | White | 25 | M | 23-Feb-1893 | Robbery and Murder | Jim Hogg |
| 192 | Charles Scott | Black | 40 | M | 15-Apr-1893 | Murder | Jim Hogg |
| 193 | Jim Burke | Black | 20 | M | 28-Apr-1893 | Rape | Jim Hogg |
| 194 | Zedolph Davis | Black | 21 | M | 28-Apr-1893 | Rape | Jim Hogg |
| 195 | Sam Massey | Black | 32 | M | 28-Apr-1893 | Rape | Jim Hogg |
| 196 | John Carlisle | White | 44 | M | 12-May-1893 | Murder | Jim Hogg |
| 197 | Charles Luttrell | White | 32 | M | 12-May-1893 | Murder | Jim Hogg |
| 198 | Harry Graham | Black | – | M | 09-Jun-1893 | Murder | Jim Hogg |
| 199 | Alexander Brown | Black | – | M | 28-Jul-1893 | Murder | Jim Hogg |
| 200 | Henry Miller | Black | 33 | M | 28-Jul-1893 | Murder | Jim Hogg |
| 201 | Walter Shaw | White | 39 | M | 04-Aug-1893 | Murder | Jim Hogg |
| 202 | Alfred McDonald | Black | 21 | M | 17-Nov-1893 | Murder | Jim Hogg |
| 203 | Alf Watson | Black | – | M | 08-Dec-1893 | Murder | Jim Hogg |
1894 – 8 executions
| 204 | Ed Nichols | Black | 21 | M | 12-Jan-1894 | Murder | Jim Hogg |
| 205 | Mannon Davis | White | 30 | M | 30-Mar-1894 | Murder | Jim Hogg |
| 206 | Eduardo Gonzales | Hispanic | 26 | M | 30-Mar-1894 | Murder | Jim Hogg |
| 207 | James Upkins | Black | 26 | M | 30-Mar-1894 | Rape | Jim Hogg |
| 208 | Joe Guiles | White | 22 | M | 24-May-1894 | Robbery and Murder | Jim Hogg |
| 209 | Austin Brown | Black | 32 | M | 25-May-1894 | Murder | Jim Hogg |
| 210 | Tom Moore | White | 33 | M | 28-Sep-1894 | Murder | Jim Hogg |
| 211 | Eugene Fulke | White | 19 | M | 28-Sep-1894 | Murder | Jim Hogg |
1895 – 10 executions
| 212 | Ed Wilcox | Black | – | M | 11-Jan-1895 | Rape | Jim Hogg |
| 213 | Andrew Jackson | Black | 20 | M | 18-Jan-1895 | Murder | Charles Allen Culberson |
| 214 | Richard Burleson | Black | 21 | M | 12-Apr-1895 | Robbery and Murder | Charles Allen Culberson |
| 215 | Lee Thomas | White | 24 | M | 02-Aug-1895 | Robbery and Murder | Charles Allen Culberson |
| 216 | Charles Key | White | 38 | M | 13-Sep-1895 | Robbery and Murder | Charles Allen Culberson |
| 217 | Kit Robertson | Black | 20 | M | 11-Oct-1895 | Robbery and Murder | Charles Allen Culberson |
| 218 | J. Q. A. Crews | White | 44 | M | 14-Oct-1895 | Murder | Charles Allen Culberson |
| 219 | Alamo McKee | Black | 19 | M | 25-Oct-1895 | Robbery and Murder | Charles Allen Culberson |
| 220 | D. L. Spearman | Black | – | M | 25-Oct-1895 | Murder | Charles Allen Culberson |
| 221 | Oscar Hennegan | Black | 21 | M | 17-Dec-1895 | Murder | Charles Allen Culberson |
1896 – 13 executions
| 222 | Buck Chappell | Black | 18 | M | 18-Mar-1896 | Murder | Charles Allen Culberson |
| 223 | Clem Strawther | Black | – | M | 18-Mar-1896 | Unknown | Charles Allen Culberson |
| 224 | Albert Rolly | Black | 20 | M | 20-Mar-1896 | Murder | Charles Allen Culberson |
| 225 | Mat Mootry | Black | – | M | 27-Mar-1896 | Murder | Charles Allen Culberson |
| 226 | Joseph Goodson | Black | 31 | M | 20-May-1896 | Robbery and Murder | Charles Allen Culberson |
| 227 | Brady Rutherford | Black | 18 | M | 20-May-1896 | Robbery and Murder | Charles Allen Culberson |
| 228 | John Rutherford | Black | 39 | M | 20-May-1896 | Robbery and Murder | Charles Allen Culberson |
| 229 | John Wilkins | White | 21 | M | 26-Jun-1896 | Robbery and Murder | Charles Allen Culberson |
| 230 | Jim Hill | Black | – | M | 03-Jul-1896 | Murder | Charles Allen Culberson |
| 231 | George Wheeler | White | 37 | M | 04-Sep-1896 | Murder | Charles Allen Culberson |
| 232 | Hickman Freeman | Black | – | M | 04-Sep-1896 | Robbery and Murder | Charles Allen Culberson |
| 233 | Silas Lee | Black | – | M | 04-Sep-1896 | Robbery and Murder | Charles Allen Culberson |
| 234 | John Dove | unknown | – | M | 30-Oct-1896 | Rape | Charles Allen Culberson |
1897 – 5 executions
| 235 | Alexander Terrell | Black | 30 | M | 02-Apr-1897 | Rape | Charles Allen Culberson |
| 236 | Dan Walker | Black | 31 | M | 28-May-1897 | Murder | Charles Allen Culberson |
| 237 | Jim Williamson | White | – | M | 25-Jun-1897 | Murder | Charles Allen Culberson |
| 238 | Prean Deon | Black | 27 | M | 09-Jul-1897 | Murder | Charles Allen Culberson |
| 239 | Maximo Martinez | Hispanic | – | M | 30-Jul-1897 | Rape and Murder | Charles Allen Culberson |
1898 – 10 executions
| 240 | George Henry | Black | 18 | M | 18-Feb-1898 | Murder | Charles Allen Culberson |
| 241 | W. Eugene Burt | White | – | M | 27-May-1898 | Murder | Charles Allen Culberson |
| 242 | Frank Martin | White | – | M | 10-Jun-1898 | Murder | Charles Allen Culberson |
| 243 | Joe Malone | Black | 23 | M | 02-Sep-1898 | Rape and Murder | Charles Allen Culberson |
| 244 | Jim Barber | Black | – | M | 07-Oct-1898 | Murder | Charles Allen Culberson |
| 245 | Charles Kugadt | White | 37 | M | 20-Oct-1898 | Murder | Charles Allen Culberson |
| 246 | Emanuel Morris | Black | 40 | M | 28-Oct-1898 | Rape | Charles Allen Culberson |
| 247 | Pete Autrey | Black | – | M | 28-Oct-1898 | Murder | Charles Allen Culberson |
| 248 | John Shaw | White | – | M | 25-Nov-1898 | Murder | Charles Allen Culberson |
| 249 | Jim King | Black | – | M | 02-Dec-1898 | Murder | Charles Allen Culberson |
1899 – 13 executions
| 250 | Fred Sawyer | White | – | M | 13-Jan-1899 | Rape | Charles Allen Culberson |
| 251 | Caesar Harris | Black | 24 | M | 16-Mar-1899 | Murder | Joseph D. Sayers |
| 252 | Pate Burton | Black | 28 | M | 24-Mar-1899 | Robbery and Murder | Joseph D. Sayers |
| 253 | Elisha Swan | Black | 20 | M | 31-Mar-1899 | Murder | Joseph D. Sayers |
| 254 | Tom Robinson | Black | – | M | 28-Apr-1899 | Rape | Joseph D. Sayers |
| 255 | Charley Little | White | – | M | 04-May-1899 | Robbery and Murder | Joseph D. Sayers |
| 256 | Clay Ford | Black | 24 | M | 20-Jul-1899 | Robbery and Murder | Joseph D. Sayers |
| 257 | James Darlington | White | 25 | M | 28-Jul-1899 | Robbery and Murder | Joseph D. Sayers |
| 258 | Walter Ford | Black | 24 | M | 27-Oct-1899 | Murder | Joseph D. Sayers |
| 259 | George Morrison | White | – | M | 27-Oct-1899 | Murder | Joseph D. Sayers |
| 260 | Sam Watrous | Black | 30 | M | 27-Oct-1899 | Murder, Rape and Robbery | Joseph D. Sayers |
| 261 | Tom Wright | White | – | M | 10-Nov-1899 | Murder | Joseph D. Sayers |
| 262 | Jim Davidson | Black | 30 | M | 24-Nov-1899 | Murder, Rape and Robbery | Joseph D. Sayers |
Source: The Espy File: 1608–2002.

| Preceded by List of people executed in Texas, 1880–1889 | Lists of people executed in Texas | Succeeded by List of people executed in Texas, 1900–1909 |

== See also ==
- Capital punishment in Texas
