= List of people executed in Texas, 1850–1859 =

The following is a list of people executed by the U.S. state of Texas between 1850 and 1859. During this period 18 people were executed by hanging.

== Executions 1850–1859 ==
1850 – 3 executions
#	Executed person	Race	Age	Sex	Date of execution	Crime(s)	Governor
10	Howard Slaughter	White	–	M	28-Dec-1850	Murder	Peter Hansborough Bell
11	(Name not known)	Hispanic	–	M	28-Dec-1850	Murder	Peter Hansborough Bell
12	(Name not known)	Hispanic	–	M	28-Dec-1850	Murder	Peter Hansborough Bell
1853 – 1 execution
13	Jane Elkins	Black	53	F	27-May-1853	Murder of Mr. Wisdom	Peter Hansborough Bell
1854 – 3 executions
14	Francisco Quiroz	Hispanic	–	M	05-Jan-1854	Murder	Elisha M. Pease
15	Lino Flores	Hispanic	–	M	05-Jan-1854	Murder	Elisha M. Pease
16	James Wilson	White	–	M	02-Jun-1854	Murder	Elisha M. Pease
1855 – 3 executions
17	John Schultz	White	44	M	29-Jun-1855	Robbery and Murder	Elisha M. Pease
18	Lovett Cady	White	50	M	29-Jun-1855	Murder	Elisha M. Pease
19	(Phillips)	Black	–	M	05-Oct-1855	Murder	Elisha M. Pease
1856 – 5 executions
20	John Hyde	White	–	M	July 1856	Murder	Elisha M. Pease
21	Jackson Bunch	Black	18	M	21-Nov-1856	Murder	Elisha M. Pease
22	Frank Hill	White	–	M	1856	Murder	Elisha M. Pease
23	(Name not known)	Black	–	M	1856	Murder	Elisha M. Pease
24	(Name not known)	Black	–	M	1856	Murder	Elisha M. Pease
1858 – 1 execution
25	Lucy (Dougherty)	Black	40	F	05-Mar-1858	Murder	Hardin R. Runnels
1859 – 2 executions
26	Peter (Valentine)	Black	16	M	27-Jan-1859	Murder	Hardin R. Runnels
27	Carroll Fike	unknown	–	M	August 1859	Murder	Hardin R. Runnels
Source: The Espy File: 1608–2002.

Preceded by List of people executed in Texas, 1819–1849	Lists of people executed in Texas	Succeeded by List of people executed in Texas, 1860–1869

== See also ==
- Capital punishment in the United States
