= List of people executed in Texas, 1950–1959 =

The following is a list of people executed by the U.S. state of Texas between 1950 and 1959. During this period 76 people were executed by electrocution at the Huntsville Unit in Texas.

Three electrocutions took place on September 5, 1951; though no intervening law to prohibit multiple executions on a single day was passed, since this date Texas has not executed more than two people in a single day.

== Executions 1950–1959 ==
1950 – 13 executions
#	Executed person	Race	Age	Sex	Date of execution	Crime(s)	Governor
257	Samuel Gibson	Black	24	M	29-Jan-1950	Murder and Burglary	Allan Shivers
258	William Wilson, Jr.	Black	31	M	05-Feb-1950	Rape	Allan Shivers
259	James Morrow	White	29	M	09-Feb-1950	Murder	Allan Shivers
260	James Blackmon	Black	24	M	05-Apr-1950	Robbery and Murder	Allan Shivers
261	William Smith, Jr.	Black	22	M	05-Apr-1950	Robbery and Murder	Allan Shivers
262	Lee Bunn	Black	27	M	03-May-1950	Murder	Allan Shivers
263	Nathaniel Edwards	Black	27	M	17-May-1950	Rape	Allan Shivers
264	Dan White	White	49	M	02-Jun-1950	Robbery and Murder	Allan Shivers
265	William Ray	White	35	M	09-Jun-1950	Rape	Allan Shivers
266	Porter Henderson	Black	47	M	14-Jun-1950	Murder	Allan Shivers
267	Felix Lewis	White	47	M	21-Jun-1950	Rape	Allan Shivers
268	Eugene McFarland	Black	26	M	30-Jun-1950	Rape	Allan Shivers
269	Edward Johnson	Black	31	M	29-Dec-1950	Rape	Allan Shivers
1951 – 13 executions
270	Ben Pickett, Jr.	Black	35	M	13-Jan-1951	Rape	Allan Shivers
271	Thomas Price	White	30	M	01-Feb-1951	Robbery and Murder	Allan Shivers
272	Jim Patterson	White	44	M	14-Mar-1951	Murder	Allan Shivers
273	Allen Williams	White	40	M	21-Mar-1951	Rape	Allan Shivers
274	Morris Bessard	Black	22	M	27-Jun-1951	Rape	Allan Shivers
275	Sam Williams	Black	53	M	03-Jul-1951	Murder	Allan Shivers
276	Y. D. Robinson	Black	33	M	16-Jul-1951	Murder	Allan Shivers
277	Allen Matthews	Black	24	M	05-Sep-1951	Rape	Allan Shivers
278	L. C. Sims	Black	26	M	05-Sep-1951	Rape	Allan Shivers
279	Fred Adair, Jr.	White	27	M	05-Sep-1951	Rape	Allan Shivers
280	Steve Mitchell	White	49	M	25-Sep-1951	Murder	Allan Shivers
281	Albert Edwards	White	39	M	09-Oct-1951	Murder	Allan Shivers
282	Abbie Morton (or Mouton)	Black	32	M	08-Dec-1951	Robbery and Murder	Allan Shivers
1952 – 10 executions
283	Richard McMurrin	Black	21	M	08-Jan-1952	Rape	Allan Shivers
284	Robert Johnson	White	34	M	12-Mar-1952	Murder	Allan Shivers
285	Marvin Johnson	White	21	M	09-Apr-1952	Murder	Allan Shivers
286	William Jones	White	58	M	26-Apr-1952	Murder	Allan Shivers
287	Henry Savage	Black	26	M	30-Apr-1952	Rape	Allan Shivers
288	Herman Ross	Black	32	M	04-Jun-1952	Robbery and Murder	Allan Shivers
289	Thomas Haley	White	27	M	10-Jul-1952	Rape	Allan Shivers
290	Major Preston	Black	34	M	08-Aug-1952	Rape	Allan Shivers
291	Booker Reed	Black	46	M	28-Oct-1952	Robbery and Murder	Allan Shivers
292	Alton Paris	Black	60	M	02-Dec-1952	Murder	Allan Shivers
1953 – 5 executions
293	Darious Goleman	White	31	M	04-Feb-1953	Robbery and Murder	Allan Shivers
294	Roy Hulen	White	43	M	06-Feb-1953	Murder	Allan Shivers
295	Samuel Gasway	White	35	M	21-Mar-1953	Rape	Allan Shivers
296	Jack Farmer	White	53	M	10-Jun-1953	Murder	Allan Shivers
297	Lewis Allison	Black	23	M	17-Oct-1953	Rape	Allan Shivers
1954 – 9 executions
298	Walter Green	White	25	M	19-Feb-1954	Robbery and Murder	Allan Shivers
299	Charles Clark	White	43	M	25-Mar-1954	Murder	Allan Shivers
300	Willie Gage	Black	42	M	23-Apr-1954	Rape	Allan Shivers
301	Charles Klinedinst	White	29	M	19-Jun-1954	Rape	Allan Shivers
302	Jimmy Richardson	Black	32	M	24-Jun-1954	Rape	Allan Shivers
303	Charles Barnes	Black	24	M	14-Jul-1954	Murder	Allan Shivers
304	Marvin Rayson	Black	28	M	17-Jul-1954	Robbery and Murder	Allan Shivers
305	Walter Whitaker, Jr.	White	22	M	01-Aug-1954	Murder	Allan Shivers
306	Maurice Sampson	Black	21	M	29-Sep-1954	Robbery and Murder	Allan Shivers
1955 – 4 executions
307	Donald Brown	White	26	M	22-Jan-1955	Murder	Allan Shivers
308	Harry Butcher, Jr.	White	29	M	20-May-1955	Rape	Allan Shivers
309	Henry Meyer	White	65	M	08-Jun-1955	Murder	Allan Shivers
310	Floyd Jackson	Black	21	M	18-Aug-1955	Rape	Allan Shivers
1956 – 7 executions
311	Carrol Farrar	White	36	M	04-Jan-1956	Murder	Allan Shivers
312	Johnnie Gordon	Black	25	M	24-Jan-1956	Rape	Allan Shivers
313	Tommy Lee Walker	Black	21	M	12-May-1956	Murder, Rape and Robbery	Allan Shivers
314	Marion Washington	Black	29	M	08-Jun-1956	Murder	Allan Shivers
315	Flandell Fite	Black	27	M	23-Aug-1956	Rape	Allan Shivers
316	Timothy Pierce	Black	23	M	30-Aug-1956	Rape	Allan Shivers
317	Leonard Bingham	White	26	M	30-Oct-1956	Robbery and Murder	Allan Shivers
1957 – 6 executions
318	John McHenry	Black	26	M	03-Jan-1957	Rape and Robbery	Allan Shivers
319	Leslie Webb	Black	32	M	04-Jan-1957	Murder	Price Daniel
320	Merle Ellisor	White	34	M	04-Apr-1957	Murder	Price Daniel
321	Yancy (or Yancey) McGowen	White	64	M	24-Apr-1957	Murder	Price Daniel
322	Wilburn(e) Hall	White	29	M	21-Aug-1957	Murder	Price Daniel
323	John Wright	Black	38	M	14-Sep-1957	Rape	Price Daniel
1958 – 6 executions
324	Charlie White	White	46	M	06-Feb-1958	Robbery and Murder	Price Daniel
325	John Mack	Black	25	M	06-Mar-1958	Rape	Price Daniel
326	Alvin Blankenship	Black	27	M	11-Jun-1958	Robbery	Price Daniel
327	Theodore Thompson	Black	23	M	20-Jun-1958	Rape	Price Daniel
328	Jimmy Shaver	White	33	M	25-Jul-1958	Rape and Murder	Price Daniel
329	Marshall Lamkin	Black	53	M	19-Sep-1958	Murder	Price Daniel
1959 – 3 executions
330	Phillip Slater	Black	36	M	04-Feb-1959	Rape and Murder	Price Daniel
331	Milton Williams	Black	28	M	28-May-1959	Rape	Price Daniel
332	Jessie Smith	Black	42	M	04-Aug-1959	Robbery and Murder	Price Daniel
Sources: List of electrocuted offenders by the TDJC, and The Espy File: 1608–2002.

Preceded by List of people executed in Texas, 1940–1949	Lists of people executed in Texas	Succeeded by List of people executed in Texas, 1960–1964

== See also ==
- Capital punishment in Texas
