= List of people executed in Texas, 1920–1929 =

The following is a list of people executed by the U.S. state of Texas between 1920 and 1929. A total of 66 people were executed during this period. From 1920 to 1923, ten people were executed by hanging. The last hanging in the state was that of Nathan Lee, a man convicted of murder and executed in Brazoria County on August 31, 1923. The law was changed in 1923 requiring executions be carried out on the electric chair and that they take place at the Huntsville Unit in Huntsville, Texas. From 1924 to 1929, 56 people were executed by electrocution, the first 5 people executed by this method took place on February 8, 1924 (this remains a state record for the number of executions in a single day).

== Executions in Texas ==
=== By hanging: 1920–1923 ===
1920 – 1 execution
#	Executed person	Race	Age	Sex	Date of execution	Crime(s)	Governor
385	John Price	Black	43	M	24-Mar-1920	Murder	William P. Hobby
1921 – 3 executions
386	Albert Howard	Black	–	M	18-Mar-1921	Rape and Robbery	Pat Morris Neff
387	Israel Jordan	Black	–	M	21-Jul-1921	Murder	Pat Morris Neff
388	Jose Flores	Hispanic	17	M	21-Jul-1921	Murder	Pat Morris Neff
1922 – 2 executions
389	George Hornsby	White	30	M	14-Apr-1922	Robbery and Murder	Pat Morris Neff
390	Abe Johnson	White	57	M	22-Sep-1922	Murder	Pat Morris Neff
1923 – 4 executions
391	Harvey Hughes	White	22	M	07-Apr-1923	Robbery and Murder	Pat Morris Neff
392	Sol Johnson	Black	–	M	20-Jul-1923	Robbery and Murder	Pat Morris Neff
393	Roy Mitchell	Black	30	M	30-Jul-1923	Murder, Rape and Robbery	Pat Morris Neff
394	Nathan Lee Sr.	Black	38	M	31-Aug-1923	Murder	Pat Morris Neff
Source: The Espy File: 1608–2002.

=== By electrocution: 1924–1929 ===
1924 – 13 executions
#	Executed person	Race	Age	Sex	Date of execution	Crime(s)	Governor
1	Charles Reynolds	Black	27	M	08-Feb-1924	Murder	Pat Morris Neff
2	Ewell Morris	Black	23	M	08-Feb-1924	Murder	Pat Morris Neff
3	George Washington	Black	39	M	08-Feb-1924	Murder	Pat Morris Neff
4	Mack Matthews	Black	39	M	08-Feb-1924	Murder	Pat Morris Neff
5	Melvin Johnson	Black	20	M	08-Feb-1924	Murder	Pat Morris Neff
6	Blaine Dyer	Black	36	M	28-Mar-1924	Murder	Pat Morris Neff
7	Earnest Lawson	Black	39	M	28-Mar-1924	Murder	Pat Morris Neff
8	Booker Williams	Black	19	M	04-Apr-1924	Murder	Pat Morris Neff
9	Tommie Curry	Black	25	M	17-Apr-1924	Murder	Pat Morris Neff
10	Harle Humphreys	Black	19	M	22-May-1924	Murder	Pat Morris Neff
11	Frank Cadena	Hispanic	35	M	23-May-1924	Murder	Pat Morris Neff
12	Ed (or Edward) Henderson	Black	45	M	09-Jun-1924	Rape	Pat Morris Neff
13	Ed Kirby	Black	57	M	10-Oct-1924	Murder	Pat Morris Neff
1925 – 6 executions							Pat Morris Neff
14	Sidney Welk	White	31	M	03-Apr-1925	Murder	Miriam A. Ferguson
15	Lavannie Twitty	Black	24	M	05-Jun-1925	Robbery and Murder	Miriam A. Ferguson
16	Frank Noel	Black	23	M	03-Jul-1925 (Note: Execution was originally scheduled for June 28, a Sunday.)	Rape	Miriam A. Ferguson
17	Lorenzo Noel	Black	25	M	03-Jul-1925	Rape	Miriam A. Ferguson
18	Edwin Rushing	Black	25	M	17-Jul-1925	Murder	Miriam A. Ferguson
19	George Gray	White	40	M	07-Aug-1925	Murder	Miriam A. Ferguson
1926 – 9 executions
20	Melton Carr	Black	23	M	02-Jan-1926	Rape	Miriam A. Ferguson
21	Agapito Rueda	Hispanic	29	M	09-Jan-1926	Robbery and Murder	Miriam A. Ferguson
22	Willie Vaughn	Black	23	M	12-Mar-1926	Rape	Miriam A. Ferguson
23	S. A. Robins (or Robinson)	Black	28	M	06-Apr-1926	Murder	Miriam A. Ferguson
24	Forest Robins (or Robinson)	Black	26	M	06-Apr-1926	Rape	Miriam A. Ferguson
25	John Smith	Black	24	M	16-Apr-1926	Murder	Miriam A. Ferguson
26	T. Harris	Black	32	M	03-May-1926	Murder	Miriam A. Ferguson
27	Sam Phillips	Black	31	M	14-May-1926	Robbery and Murder	Miriam A. Ferguson
28	Fred Tilford	Black	24	M	09-Jul-1926	Robbery and Murder	Miriam A. Ferguson
1927 – 8 executions
29	F. D. Baines	Black	29	M	18-Feb-1927	Murder	Dan Moody
30	Bryant Satchell	Black	22	M	17-Mar-1927	Robbery and Murder	Dan Moody
31	Matthew Briscoe	Black	37	M	10-May-1927	Rape	Dan Moody
32	Francis Marion Snow	White	49	M	12-Aug-1927	Murder	Dan Moody
33	Ed Joshlin	Black	58	M	22-Aug-1927	Rape	Dan Moody
34	Willie Robinson	Black	23	M	23-Sep-1927	Murder and Burglary	Dan Moody
35	Tillman Simmons	Black	50	M	26-Sep-1927	Robbery and Murder	Dan Moody
36	A. V. Mullikin (or Millikin)	White	40	M	05-Nov-1927	Robbery and Murder	Dan Moody
1928 – 9 executions
37	George Hassell	White	39	M	10-Feb-1928	Murder	Dan Moody
38	Robert Benton	Black	23	M	10-Feb-1928	Murder	Dan Moody
39	Willie Fisher	Black	31	M	12-Apr-1928	Murder	Dan Moody
40	Lawrence Davenport	Black	22	M	01-Jun-1928	Robbery and Murder	Dan Moody
41	Garrett Thomas	Black	32	M	03-Aug-1928	Murder	Dan Moody
42	Esequiel Servin	Hispanic	23	M	07-Sep-1928	Rape and Robbery	Dan Moody
43	Clemente Rodriguez	Hispanic	22	M	07-Sep-1928	Rape and Robbery	Dan Moody
44	O. T. Alexander	Black	40	M	28-Sep-1928	Murder	Dan Moody
45	Tom Ross	Black	35	M	28-Sep-1928	Murder	Dan Moody
1929 – 11 executions
46	Floyd Byrnes	White	26	M	11-Jan-1929	Robbery and Murder	Dan Moody
47	Wade Wilborn	Black	47	M	12-Apr-1929	Murder	Dan Moody
48	Robert Blake	White	25	M	19-Apr-1929	Robbery and Murder	Dan Moody
49	Mathis Sanders	Black	26	M	27-Apr-1929	Rape	Dan Moody
50	Silas Jarman	Black	18	M	24-May-1929	Robbery	Dan Moody
51	O. C. Wells	White	32	M	20-Jun-1929	Robbery and Murder	Dan Moody
52	Willie Grady	Black	19	M	25-Jul-1929	Rape	Dan Moody
53	H. J. Leahy	White	41	M	02-Sep-1929	Kidnapping and Murder	Dan Moody
54	Henry Helms	White	33	M	06-Sep-1929	Murder	Dan Moody
55	Lee Merriman	White	27	M	29-Nov-1929	Rape	Dan Moody
56	Ben (Bennie) Aldridge	White	26	M	19-Dec-1929	Rape	Dan Moody
Sources: List of electrocuted offenders by the TDJC, and The Espy File: 1608–2002.

== Statistics ==
- 100% of people executed from 1920 to 1929 were male.
- In 1924, of the 13 people executed, there was only one rape. All other crimes were murder.

Preceded by List of people executed in Texas, 1910–1919	Lists of people executed in Texas	Succeeded by List of people executed in Texas, 1930–1939

== See also ==
- Capital punishment in Texas
