= George Hassell =

Executed American serial mass murderer (1888–1928)

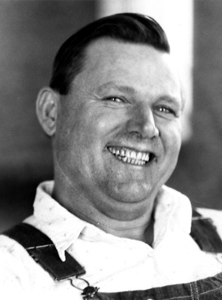
- Born: George Jefferson Hassell; July 5, 1888; Smithville, Texas, U.S.
- Died: February 10, 1928 (aged 39); Huntsville Unit, Texas, U.S.
- Status: Executed by electrocution
- Convictions: Murder with malice Embezzlement; Desertion
- Penalty: Death

Details
- Victims: 13
- Span of crimes: 1917–1926
- Country: United States
- Locations: Whittier, California, and Farwell, Texas
- Target: Family members
- Weapons: Ballpeen hammer Straight razor Stockings; Shotgun; Axe

George Jefferson Hassell (July 5, 1888 – February 10, 1928) was an American serial mass murderer who killed his wife and eight children (from one to 21 years old) on December 5, 1926, in Farwell, Texas. After his arrest, Hassell also confessed to the murder of his previous family, consisting of his wife, stepson, and two adopted children, in California in 1917.

== Family background ==
Hassell was born in Smithville, Texas, the youngest of seven children. After his brother Thomas died from being kicked in the head by a mule, he married his brother's widow, Susan Ferguson of Oklahoma. According to Hassell, his mother died in 1901 and his father died in 1905. Believing that his stepmother had poisoned his father, Hassell said he'd planned to kill her and anyone with her, but said "I got too much whiskey and didn't use any gun." Hassell also said he served prison time for embezzlement.

== Crime ==
On the night of December 5, 1926, Hassell and his wife argued over him raping and impregnating Ferguson's underage daughter Maudie, who was Hassell's own niece as well as his stepdaughter. Hassell proceeded to strike his wife in the face repeatedly with a ballpeen hammer. After he murdered his wife, he went to each of the other family members' bedrooms, using a straight razor and stockings to kill them, in order from youngest to oldest. The two oldest boys awoke and a scuffle ensued, ending with Hassell killing the boys with a shotgun and an axe. All of the bodies were then stored in the newly dug root cellar by the house. The eldest Hassell son, Alton, was threshing wheat in Clovis, New Mexico, for extra money and was not supposed to come home for another four days. Hassell decided to wait for him. In the meantime, he cleaned up the blood and buried the bodies. When Alton returned, Hassell told him that the family had gone to Shallowater, Texas, to visit an aunt. The two men killed a chicken and cooked dinner, then went to their bedrooms. Hassell later said that he needed to drink whiskey to work up the nerve to kill again. After getting drunk, he grabbed the shotgun, went to Alton's bedroom, and shot him in the head as he was sleeping.

=== Victims ===
- Susan, age 40
- Alton, age 21
- David, age 15
- Maudie, age 13
- Russell, age 11
- Virgil, age 7
- Johnnie, age 6
- Nannie Martha, age 4
- Samuel, age 1
- Marie Vogel (Whittier, CA)
- Vogel adopted son, 8 (Whittier, CA)
- Vogel adopted daughter, 2 (Whittier, CA)
- Vogel adopted daughter, 1 (Whittier, CA)

=== Arrest, trial, and execution ===
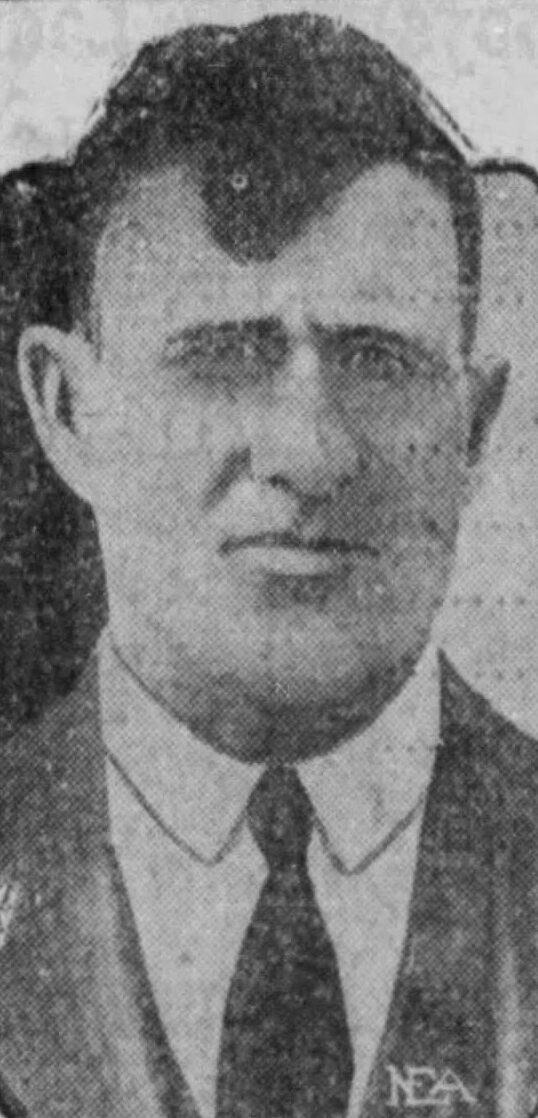
Hassell shortly after his arrest

Claiming that he and his family were returning to Oklahoma, Hassell sold all of their belongings in a large yard sale. During the auction, a wagon ran over the sinkhole and aroused the suspicion of law enforcement. Soon afterward, Hassell unsuccessfully attempted suicide, and excavations revealed the remains in the root cellar. He also confessed the murder of the members of his other family in 1917, Marie Vogel and her three adopted children, two of whom were adopted from Colorado: a boy c. 8, a girl c. 5 and an infant c. 1. They were living under the family name "Baker" in Whittier, California. Hassell said he killed his common-law wife and three children during an argument over whether he would join the Army to fight in World War I. His confession was corroborated after he directed the police to the location of the bodies. Hassell said he confessed to the earlier murders to ensure no one was wrongfully accused of committing them.

Hassell blamed his first wife, whom he'd married in 1909, for inciting the murders. He'd married her in Texas in 1909. He then went to Oklahoma to join the Army, then deserted to join the Navy in California since he wanted to see his family. During this time, Hassell received a letter from his wife, who said she was through with him. Hassell claimed that the letter ruined his life. Shortly after, he was arrested for desertion and spent two years in a military prison. When he returned to Texas to see his family, his wife and son wanted nothing to do with him.

After Hassell confessed, a short trial was convened, and Farwell and its sister city of Texico, New Mexico, took on a carnival atmosphere. He was only tried for Alton's murder. During his trial, Hassell claimed the initial murders were a spur of the moment crime and that he couldn't stop. A psychiatrist declared Hassell sane, and he was found guilty of murder with malice and sentenced to death.

At the time, death row for men and the execution chamber were both at Huntsville Unit. On February 10, 1928, George Hassell became the 37th man to be put to death in the electric chair in the state of Texas. He is buried at Captain Joe Byrd Cemetery.

== Motive ==
Hassell had a lengthy history of criminal behavior. A psychiatric report at the time characterizes him as a sociopath. Hassell had allegedly been thinking about murder since he was 17 and before joining the Army.

== See also ==
- List of homicides in California
- List of serial killers in the United States
