= Murder of Chere Jo Horton =

1954 murder of a three-year-old girl in San Antonio, Texas

The murder of Chere Jo Horton occurred on the night of July 3–4, 1954, in San Antonio, Texas. Jimmy Shaver was arrested, tried, convicted, and executed for the murder.

== Murder ==
On the night of her disappearance, Chere Jo's parents left the three-year-old girl alone while they were inside the Lazy A tavern. After she went missing, a search was undertaken. A car was found parked with the girl's underwear hanging from its door. Jimmy Shaver, a technical instructor stationed at the local Air Force base, was found shirtless, covered in scratches. The girl's body was found nearby, having been raped and murdered.

== Arrest and trial ==
Shaver, a thrice-married airman third class in the U.S. Air Force, initially blamed another airman, Sumpter Brawley, who was briefly held as a material witness before being released. Once in custody, Shaver was moved to a secret location after police received tips of a possible attempted lynching. It was later revealed Shaver had been moved to the Travis County jail in Austin.

On July 13, Shaver was formally indicted by a Bexar County grand jury. A change of venue was ordered, moving it out of San Antonio to Brady, Texas. Shaver's court appointed attorney, Manual C. Gonzales, petitioned the court for Shaver to be examined by an Air Force psychiatrist. Additional attorneys joined the defense. Air Force psychiatrists signed an affidavit saying Shaver was "not able to distinguish right from wrong". Three psychiatrists testified Shaver was insane, while chief psychiatrist Louis West described examining the defendant under the effect of hypnosis and truth serum. A jury found Shaver sane.

The state introduced the victims' parents, the tavern owner, Airman Sumpter Brawley, who spent time with the defendant that evening, and three airmen who had visited the tavern. The prosecution introduced a statement Shaver had made on the day of his arrest, saying, "If she was raped and if she is dead then I must be responsible since I was the one who picked her up and put her in my care." The defense began its case on September 30. Shaver was convicted at his first trial, but attorneys alleged juror misconduct after evidence emerged that two of the jurors had made statements vowing to sentence Shaver to death prior to the start of the trial. The trial judge denied a request for a new trial. After an appeals court ruled the trial was unfair, Shaver was again convicted at a retrial.

== Execution and legacy ==
On February 5, 1958, Shaver was given a stay of execution just three hours before he was due to be executed in the electric chair. Another prisoner, Donald Summers, confessed to the murder. As a result, the Governor issued a stay. Summers later recanted and said Shaver had offered to pay him for taking credit for the crime. He received a third execution-eve stay on March 18. On July 25, 1958, Shaver was executed in the electric chair.

The case was discussed in the 2019 writings of Tom O'Neill and Dan Piepenbring as well as a 2025 documentary by Errol Morris.

== See also ==
- List of people executed in Texas, 1950–1959
- List of people executed in the United States in 1958
