= List of people executed in Texas, 1900–1909 =

The following is a list of people executed by the U.S. state of Texas between 1900 and 1909. During this period 71 people were executed by hanging.

== Executions 1900–1909 ==
1900 – 11 executions
#	Executed person	Race	Age	Sex	Date of execution	Crime(s)	Governor
263	Antonio Flores	Hispanic	–	M	06-Jan-1900	Murder	Joseph D. Sayers
264	Geronimo Para	Hispanic	–	M	06-Jan-1900	Murder	Joseph D. Sayers
265	Ellis Misebel	Black	–	M	12-Jan-1900	Rape	Joseph D. Sayers
266	Willie Jones	Black	28	M	09-Mar-1900	Murder	Joseph D. Sayers
267	King Martin	Black	–	M	16-Mar-1900	Rape	Joseph D. Sayers
268	Nevison Morris	Black	30	M	23-Mar-1900	Murder	Joseph D. Sayers
269	Frank White	Black	–	M	23-Mar-1900	Robbery and Murder	Joseph D. Sayers
270	Bob McKinney	Black	–	M	16-Apr-1900	Murder	Joseph D. Sayers
271	Henry Brown	Black	18	M	07-May-1900	Murder	Joseph D. Sayers
272	Sid Spears	Black	–	M	18-Jun-1900	Murder	Joseph D. Sayers
273	John Renfro	White	–	M	27-Jul-1900	Murder	Joseph D. Sayers
1901 – 4 executions
274	Augustus Davis	Black	–	M	14-Mar-1901	Murder	Joseph D. Sayers
275	Juan Rocha	Hispanic	60	M	02-Aug-1901	Murder	Joseph D. Sayers
276	John Pearl	White	–	M	22-Oct-1901	Robbery and Murder	Joseph D. Sayers
277	Will King	Black	–	M	25-Oct-1901	Murder	Joseph D. Sayers
1902 – 8 executions
278	Anderson Norris	Black	–	M	10-Jan-1902	Murder	Joseph D. Sayers
279	Thomas Morris	White	–	M	31-Jan-1902	Robbery and Murder	Joseph D. Sayers
280	John Roan	Black	28	M	19-Apr-1902	Rape	Joseph D. Sayers
281	Andres Olivarez	Hispanic	–	M	02-Jun-1902	Murder	Joseph D. Sayers
282	John Warren	Black	–	M	15-Aug-1902	Robbery and Murder	Joseph D. Sayers
283	Vincent Sancedo	Hispanic	27	M	19-Sep-1902	Rape	Joseph D. Sayers
284	Jim Buchanan	Black	–	M	16-Oct-1902	Rape and Murder	Joseph D. Sayers
285	Jeff Mikel	Black	–	M	13-Dec-1902	Murder	Joseph D. Sayers
1903 – 7 executions
286	John Ransom	Black	–	M	03-Apr-1903	Robbery and Murder	S. W. T. Lanham
287	Rip Johnson	Black	–	M	14-May-1903	Murder	S. W. T. Lanham
288	Charley Jones	Black	–	M	23-May-1903	Rape	S. W. T. Lanham
289	J. E. (Ed) Shutt	White	–	M	29-May-1903	Murder of B. C. Whittier	S. W. T. Lanham
290	Henry Johnson	Black	–	M	30-May-1903	Rape	S. W. T. Lanham
291	George Harkey	Black	–	M	30-Jun-1903	Murder	S. W. T. Lanham
292	Marguerito Reyna	Hispanic	–	M	04-Dec-1903	Rape	S. W. T. Lanham
1904 – 6 executions
293	Henry Fugett	Black	–	M	12-Feb-1904	Murder	S. W. T. Lanham
294	Brozier Smith	Black	21	M	25-Mar-1904	Murder	S. W. T. Lanham
295	Will Murray	Black	–	M	25-Apr-1904	Murder	S. W. T. Lanham
296	Henry Williams	Black	30	M	02-May-1904	Rape and Murder	S. W. T. Lanham
297	Bacente Losarno	Hispanic	19	M	16-Jun-1904	Murder	S. W. T. Lanham
298	Appolonario Hernandez	Hispanic	–	M	23-Dec-1904	Murder	S. W. T. Lanham
1905 – 7 executions
299	John Reeves	unknown	–	M	17-Feb-1905	Murder	S. W. T. Lanham
300	Conrad Schwartz	White	20	M	22-Mar-1905	Robbery and Murder	S. W. T. Lanham
301	John Henry Young	Black	20	M	31-Mar-1905	Murder	S. W. T. Lanham
302	Holly Vann	White	30	M	12-May-1905	Robbery and Murder	S. W. T. Lanham
303	Sam Collins	Black	–	M	19-May-1905	Murder	S. W. T. Lanham
304	Presley Tankersley	Black	–	M	01-Sep-1905	Murder	S. W. T. Lanham
305	George Turner	White	43	M	22-Dec-1905	Robbery and Murder	S. W. T. Lanham
1906 – 6 executions
306	Thomas Young	White	40	M	30-Mar-1906	Murder	S. W. T. Lanham
307	Jack Wilkerson	White	–	M	29-Jun-1906	Murder	S. W. T. Lanham
308	Rufus Martin	Black	–	M	12-Jul-1906	Robbery and Murder	S. W. T. Lanham
309	Robert Johnson	Black	–	M	20-Jul-1906	Murder	S. W. T. Lanham
310	Dick Garrett	Black	–	M	21-Nov-1906	Murder	S. W. T. Lanham
311	Henry Brown	Black	33	M	30-Nov-1906	Murder	S. W. T. Lanham
1907 – 5 executions
312	Alberto Vargas	Hispanic	18	M	04-Jan-1907	Murder	S. W. T. Lanham
313	A. B. Washington	Black	–	M	14-Feb-1907	Murder	Thomas Mitchell Campbell
314	Felix Powell	Black	–	M	02-Apr-1907	Rape and Murder	Thomas Mitchell Campbell
315	John Armstrong	Black	–	M	26-Apr-1907	Murder	Thomas Mitchell Campbell
316	Dock Bailey	Black	–	M	07-Nov-1907	Robbery and Murder	Thomas Mitchell Campbell
1908 – 6 executions
317	John Brown	Black	–	M	27-Mar-1908	Rape	Thomas Mitchell Campbell
318	James Cason	White	35	M	29-May-1908	Robbery and Murder	Thomas Mitchell Campbell
319	Tom Jones	Black	–	M	20-Jun-1908	Robbery and Murder	Thomas Mitchell Campbell
320	Monk Gibson	Black	19	M	28-Jun-1908	Rape and Murder	Thomas Mitchell Campbell
321	J. Williams	Black	–	M	31-Jul-1908	Robbery and Murder	Thomas Mitchell Campbell
322	Frank Mitchell	Black	–	M	01-Aug-1908	Murder	Thomas Mitchell Campbell
1909 – 11 executions
323	John Boyd	Black	–	M	08-Jan-1909	Rape	Thomas Mitchell Campbell
324	Claude Golden	Black	45	M	12-Feb-1909	Rape	Thomas Mitchell Campbell
325	Johnnie Green	Black	20	M	25-Feb-1909	Robbery and Murder	Thomas Mitchell Campbell
326	Edmund Shelton	Black	–	M	14-May-1909	Murder	Thomas Mitchell Campbell
327	Refugio Juareque	Hispanic	–	M	11-Jun-1909	Rape	Thomas Mitchell Campbell
328	Willis Macklin	Black	–	M	02-Jul-1909	Murder	Thomas Mitchell Campbell
329	Marcellus Thomas	Black	–	M	03-Sep-1909	Murder	Thomas Mitchell Campbell
330	Will McIntosh	Black	–	M	01-Oct-1909	Murder	Thomas Mitchell Campbell
331	Lee Russell	Black	–	M	01-Oct-1909	Rape and Murder	Thomas Mitchell Campbell
332	Tom Willison	Black	23	M	22-Oct-1909	Murder	Thomas Mitchell Campbell
333	Robert Wright	White	–	M	17-Dec-1909	Murder	Thomas Mitchell Campbell
Source: The Espy File: 1608–2002.

Preceded by List of people executed in Texas, 1890–1899	Lists of people executed in Texas	Succeeded by List of people executed in Texas, 1910–1919

== See also ==
- Capital punishment in Texas
