= Lists of people executed in Texas =

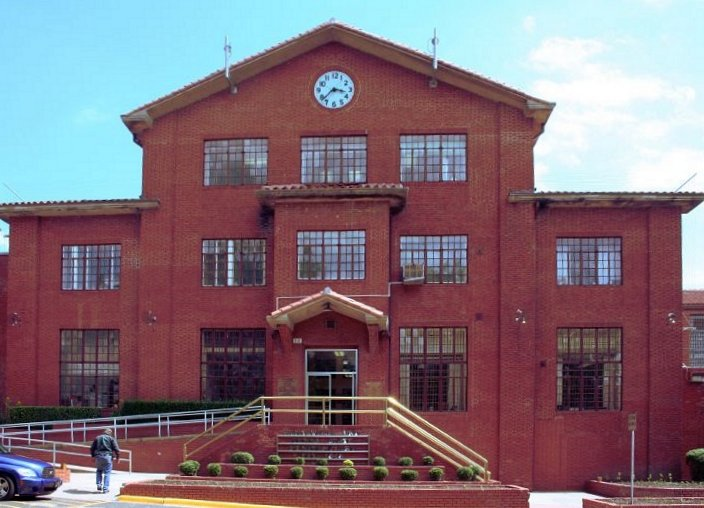
Huntsville Unit, the location of the State of Texas execution chamber

The list of people executed by the U.S. state of Texas, with the exception of 1819–1849, is divided into periods of 10 years.

Since 1819, 1,354 people (all but nine of whom have been men) have been executed in Texas as of November 19, 2026.

Between 1819 and 1923, 390 people were executed by hanging in the county where the trial took place. During the American Civil War, three Confederate deserters and a man convicted of attempted rape were executed by firing squad. The law was changed in 1923 requiring executions to be carried out in the electric chair at the Huntsville Unit in Huntsville, Texas. From 1924 to 1964, 361 people were executed in this way. After an 18-year gap following Furman v. Georgia, executions were resumed following new capital-punishment laws passed by the State of Texas (and upheld in Gregg v. Georgia, which also included a companion case from Texas), among them changing the method of execution to lethal injection.

Since 1982 and as of November 19, 2026, 605 people (all of whom were convicted of murder) have been executed by lethal injection at the Huntsville Unit. The number is over four times as many as Oklahoma (the state with the second-highest total of executions in the post-Gregg era and the only one with a higher execution rate) and over 46 times as many as California (the state with the largest number of death row inmates; California has not executed anyone since January 2006, and has a moratorium on capital punishment as of March 2019).

== Executions from 1819 ==
- 1819–1849: 9 executions
- 1850–1859: 18 executions
- 1860–1869: 20 executions
- 1870–1879: 50 executions
- 1880–1889: 64 executions
- 1890–1899: 101 executions
- 1900–1909: 71 executions
- 1910–1919: 51 executions
- 1920–1929: 66 executions
- 1930–1939: 122 executions
- 1940–1949: 78 executions
- 1950–1959: 76 executions
- 1960–1964: 29 executions
- 1982–1989: 33 executions
- 1990–1999: 166 executions
- 2000–2009: 248 executions
- 2010–2019: 120 executions
- 2020–present: 38 executions

== See also ==
- Capital punishment in Texas
- Capital punishment in the United States
- Lists of people executed in the United States
