= Rutland County Museum =

UK museum highlighting local history and archaeology

Coordinates: 52.6679°N 0.7255°W

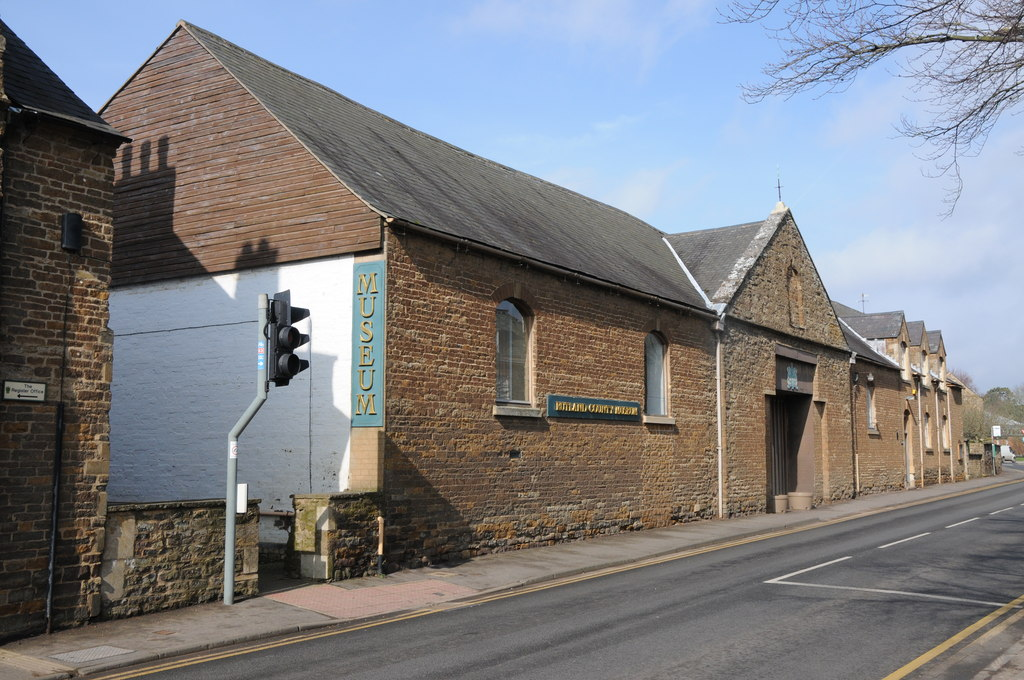
- Rutland County Museum
- Established: 1969
- Location: Oakham, Rutland, United Kingdom
- Website: rutlandcountymuseum.org.uk

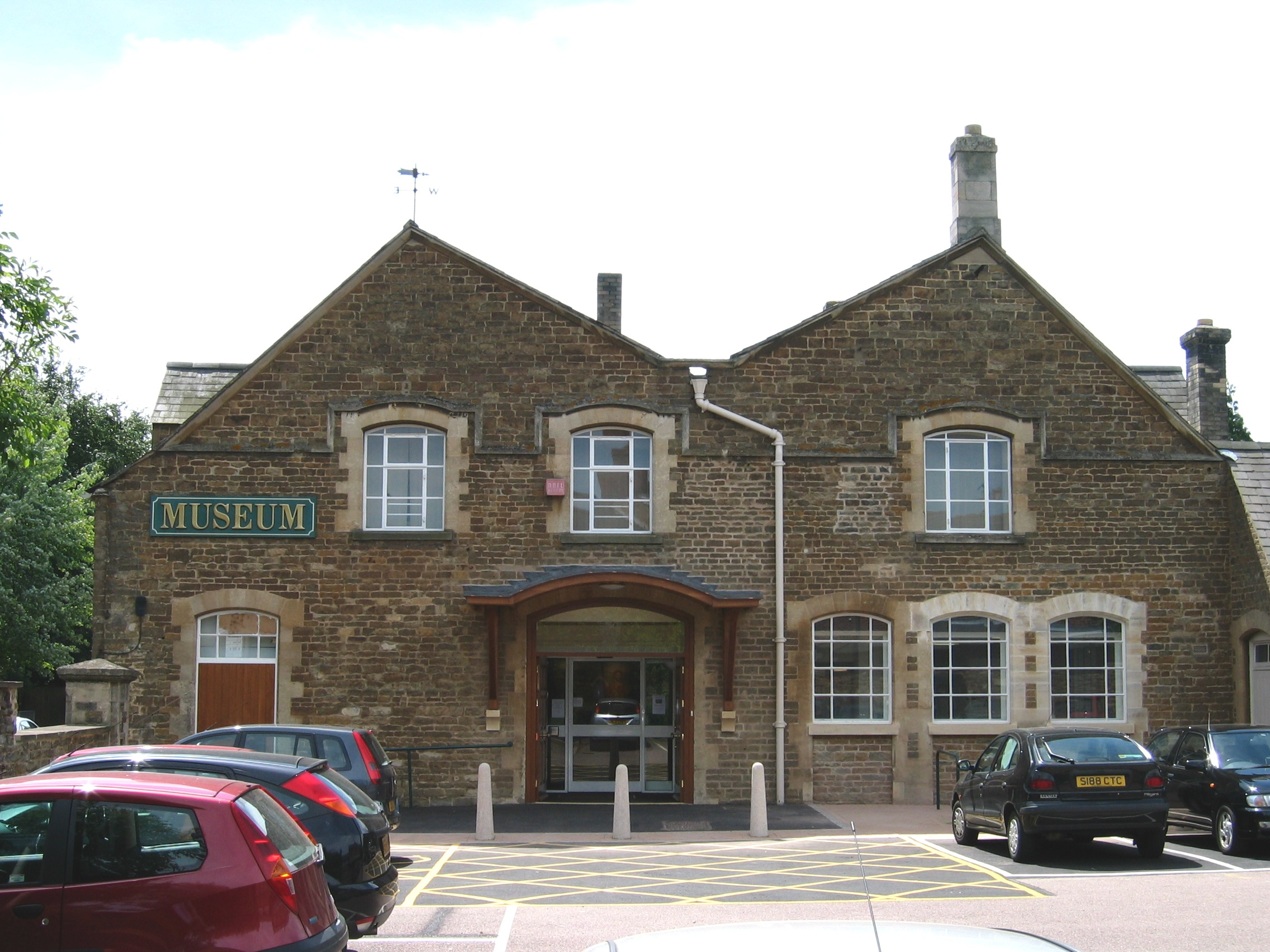
Museum entrance

Rutland County Museum is located in Oakham, Rutland, in the old Riding School of the Rutland Fencible Cavalry which was built in 1794–1795. The museum, opened in 1969, houses a collection of objects relating to local rural and agricultural life, social history and archaeology. Temporary exhibitions are shown alongside the permanent displays. Admission to the museum is free.

== Collection ==
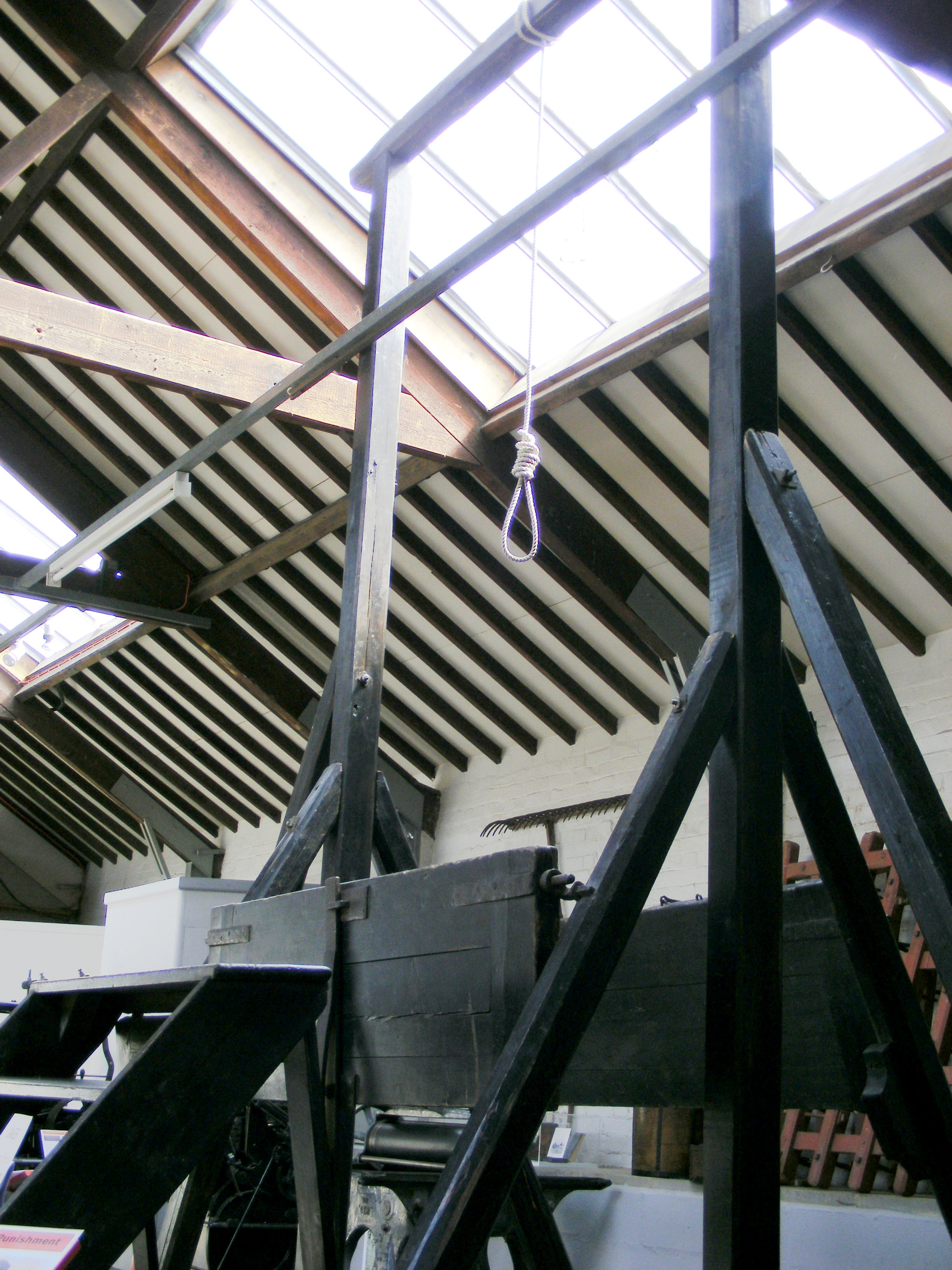
The Gallows

The Museum's original collections were those transferred to it when it was set up by the former Rutland County Council in 1967. These were the rural life collection of E. G. Bolton from Casterton Secondary Modern School and the mainly archaeological collection from Oakham School. Over the years the Museum has grown and it now has an extensive rural life collection which includes farm tools, tractors, wagons and a wide range of rural tradesmen's tools. In addition it also houses domestic and social history items, along with a large collection of archaeological material from around Rutland.

One of the more thought-provoking items on display is the New Drop Gallows. It is thought to be the only surviving gallows of its type in the UK. The gallows were portable and were set up at the front of Oakham Gaol when needed. The gallows was first used in 1813 to hang two burglars. The New Drop design was not to be very effective as the drop was too short to break the neck cleanly. According to the museum’s curator, the framework, built of Baltic pine, forms the only surviving example of a portable “New Drop” gallows in the United Kingdom.

The Museum has one of the oldest surviving box wagons in the country. Built in Lincolnshire and used on a farm in Preston, Rutland it dates from 1755–1795 and is unusual due to its wooden axles.

One of the smaller items on display includes the Brooke Reliquary. This small enamelled casket dates from the 13th century and originates from the workshops in Limoges, France and is believed to have held the relics of a saint. The reliquary was discovered in c.1805, after years of being concealed on the site of Brooke Priory, when building work was carried out in the cellar of Priory House. The reliquary is decorated with Limoges enamel work in shades of blue, red, yellow and green with images of Christ with two apostles or saints. The robes on the saints are engraved on copper plates which were originally gilded, but this has now worn away.

== Local Studies Collection ==
The Local Studies collection was moved from Oakham Library to the museum in 2010 and comprises a large collection of materials and resources on Rutland and the surrounding villages. It includes census records for Rutland, photographs of local villages, the Jack Hart postcard collection, Ordnance Survey maps of Rutland, editions of local newspapers and offers access to ancestry.co.uk (library edition). The collection also contains a wide range of reference books.
