= List of people executed in Texas, 1910–1919 =

The following is a list of people executed by the U.S. state of Texas between 1910 and 1919. During this period 51 people were executed by hanging.

== Executions 1910–1919 ==
1910 – 7 executions
| # | Executed person | Race | Age | Sex | Date of execution | Crime(s) | Governor |
|---|---|---|---|---|---|---|---|
| 334 | Gus Thomas | Black | 24 | M | 26-Feb-1910 | Murder | Thomas Mitchell Campbell |
| 335 | Sam Washington | Black | 34 | M | 26-Feb-1910 | Murder | Thomas Mitchell Campbell |
| 336 | Bubber Robertson | Black | 28 | M | 14-May-1910 | Robbery and Murder | Thomas Mitchell Campbell |
| 337 | G. R. Miller | Black | – | M | 03-Jun-1910 | Robbery and Murder | Thomas Mitchell Campbell |
| 338 | John Wynne | Black | – | M | 24-Jun-1910 | Murder | Thomas Mitchell Campbell |
| 339 | John Canon | Black | – | M | 08-Jul-1910 | Murder | Thomas Mitchell Campbell |
| 340 | Henry Henderson | Black | 22 | M | 08-Jul-1910 | Robbery and Murder | Thomas Mitchell Campbell |
| 1912 – 10 executions | | | | | | | Thomas Mitchell Campbell |
| 341 | Louis Johnson | Black | 20 | M | 30-Jan-1912 | Rape | Oscar Branch Colquitt |
| 342 | Albert Varner | Black | – | M | 16-Feb-1912 | Rape | Oscar Branch Colquitt |
| 343 | J. B. Compton | White | – | M | 15-Mar-1912 | Robbery and Murder | Oscar Branch Colquitt |
| 344 | Dan McCline | Black | 26 | M | 29-Mar-1912 | Murder | Oscar Branch Colquitt |
| 345 | Charlie McClennan | Black | 25 | M | 13-Apr-1912 | Murder | Oscar Branch Colquitt |
| 346 | John Henry | Black | – | M | 12-Jul-1912 | Murder | Oscar Branch Colquitt |
| 347 | Wood Maxey | Black | – | M | 09-Aug-1912 | Murder | Oscar Branch Colquitt |
| 348 | Sellers Vines | Black | – | M | 09-Aug-1912 | Murder | Oscar Branch Colquitt |
| 349 | Sam Jones | Black | 45 | M | 16-Oct-1912 | Murder | Oscar Branch Colquitt |
| 350 | Burrell Oates | Black | – | M | 29-Nov-1912 | Robbery and Murder | Oscar Branch Colquitt |
1913 – 8 executions
| 351 | John Robison | Black | – | M | 10-Jan-1913 | Robbery and Murder | Oscar Branch Colquitt |
| 352 | Diggs Perry | Black | – | M | 21-Apr-1913 | Robbery and Murder | Oscar Branch Colquitt |
| 353 | Abraham Ortiz | Hispanic | 22 | M | 02-May-1913 | Rape and Murder | Oscar Branch Colquitt |
| 354 | Henry Brock | White | – | M | 30-May-1913 | Murder | Oscar Branch Colquitt |
| 355 | William Asbeck | White | 42 | M | 28-Jun-1913 | Murder | Oscar Branch Colquitt |
| 356 | Floyd Stanton | Black | – | M | 01-Aug-1913 | Murder | Oscar Branch Colquitt |
| 357 | Ernest Harrison | Black | – | M | 07-Aug-1913 | Robbery and Murder | Oscar Branch Colquitt |
| 358 | Paul Fowler | Black | – | M | 07-Aug-1913 | Robbery and Murder | Oscar Branch Colquitt |
1914 – 4 executions
| 359 | Tommie Lee | Black | – | M | 09-Mar-1914 | Murder | Oscar Branch Colquitt |
| 360 | Leon Martinez, Jr. | Hispanic | 19 | M | 11-May-1914 | Murder | Oscar Branch Colquitt |
| 361 | Porfirio Torrez | Hispanic | – | M | 14-Aug-1914 | Murder | Oscar Branch Colquitt |
| 362 | Henry Wilson | Black | – | M | 14-Dec-1914 | Robbery | Oscar Branch Colquitt |
1915 – 7 executions
| 363 | Ysidro Gonzalez | Hispanic | – | M | 01-Feb-1915 | Murder | James E. Ferguson |
| 364 | Henry Ballard | Black | 21 | M | 19-Feb-1915 | Murder | James E. Ferguson |
| 365 | Will Hemphill | Black | – | M | 26-Feb-1915 | Rape | James E. Ferguson |
| 366 | Federico Sanchez | Hispanic | 15 | M | 03-Mar-1915 | Murder | James E. Ferguson |
| 367 | Benigno Guerrero | Hispanic | – | M | 15-Apr-1915 | Murder | James E. Ferguson |
| 368 | Joe Larkins | Black | – | M | 17-Apr-1915 | Murder | James E. Ferguson |
| 369 | Cornelius Jackson | Black | – | M | 02-Jul-1915 | Robbery and Murder | James E. Ferguson |
1916 – 9 executions
| 370 | Floyd Thompson | Black | – | M | 07-Jan-1916 | Murder | James E. Ferguson |
| 371 | Louis Utley | Black | – | M | 01-Feb-1916 | Murder | James E. Ferguson |
| 372 | Henry Sampson | Black | – | M | 13-Feb-1916 | Robbery and Murder | James E. Ferguson |
| 373 | Sam Jernigan | Black | – | M | 11-Mar-1916 | Rape | James E. Ferguson |
| 374 | Robert Burgess | White | – | M | 29-Apr-1916 | Murder | James E. Ferguson |
| 375 | Melquiades Chapa | Hispanic | 23 | M | 19-May-1916 | Murder | James E. Ferguson |
| 376 | Jose Buenrostro | Hispanic | 25 | M | 19-May-1916 | Murder | James E. Ferguson |
| 377 | Clarence Cooley | Black | 21 | M | 18-Oct-1916 | Robbery and Murder | James E. Ferguson |
| 378 | John Williams | Black | – | M | 27-Oct-1916 | Murder | James E. Ferguson |
1918 – 6 executions
| 379 | Walter Stevenson | White | – | M | 24-May-1918 | Rape | William P. Hobby |
| 380 | Leonard Dodd | White | – | M | 24-May-1918 | Rape | William P. Hobby |
| 381 | James Franklin | Black | – | M | 16-Aug-1918 | Murder | William P. Hobby |
| 382 | Harvey Hubert | Black | 34 | M | 23-Aug-1918 | Murder | William P. Hobby |
| 383 | Will Jones | Black | 30 | M | 30-Aug-1918 | Rape and Murder | William P. Hobby |
| 384 | Rufus Coates | White | 19 | M | 08-Nov-1918 | Murder | William P. Hobby |
Source: The Espy File: 1608–2002.

| Preceded by List of people executed in Texas, 1900–1909 | Lists of people executed in Texas | Succeeded by List of people executed in Texas, 1920–1929 |

== See also ==
- Capital punishment in Texas
