= List of people executed in Texas, 1870–1879 =

The following is a list of people executed by the U.S. state of Texas between 1870 and 1879. During this period 50 people were executed by hanging.

== Executions 1870–1879 ==
1871 – 4 executions
#	Executed person	Race	Age	Sex	Date of execution	Crime(s)	Governor
48	Henry Miller	Black	–	M	28-Jul-1871	Murder	Edmund J. Davis
49	Meredith Haynes	Black	27	M	15-Dec-1871	Murder	Edmund J. Davis
50	Bartolo Guerra	Hispanic	–	M	22-Dec-1871	Murder	Edmund J. Davis
51	Oscar Clarke	unknown	–	M	1871	Unknown	Edmund J. Davis
1872 – 1 executions
52	Stephen Ballew	White	28	M	24-May-1872	Robbery and Murder	Edmund J. Davis
1873 – 6 executions
53	Arthur Shelby	unknown	–	M	15-Jan-1873	Murder	Edmund J. Davis
54	Ben Shelby	unknown	–	M	15-Jan-1873	Murder	Edmund J. Davis
55	William Smith	unknown	–	M	15-Jan-1873	Murder	Edmund J. Davis
56	Ball Woods	unknown	–	M	15-Jan-1873	Murder	Edmund J. Davis
57	George Barnes	White	26	M	14-Apr-1873	Robbery and Murder	Edmund J. Davis
58	Lawson Kimball	White	31	M	14-Apr-1873	Robbery and Murder	Edmund J. Davis
1874 – 5 executions
59	Sol Bragg	Black	–	M	June 1874	Robbery and Murder	Richard Coke
60	Andres Davila	Hispanic	–	M	07-Aug-1874	Robbery and Murder	Richard Coke
61	Hipolita Tapia	Hispanic	–	M	07-Aug-1874	Robbery and Murder	Richard Coke
62	Ely Bly	Black	–	M	07-Aug-1874	Murder	Richard Coke
63	Edward Jenkins	Black	–	M	17-Aug-1874	Murder	Richard Coke
1875 – 4 executions
64	James Cooper	Black	–	M	30-Apr-1875	Murder	Richard Coke
65	Griffin Williams	Black	–	M	30-Apr-1875	Rape	Richard Coke
66	Juan Flores	Hispanic	–	M	26-Jun-1875	Murder	Richard Coke
67	Nelson Mitchell	White	78	M	09-Oct-1875	Murder	Richard Coke
1876 – 4 executions
68	Wesley Jones	Black	–	M	11-Aug-1876	Rape	Richard Coke
69	Bill Payne	Black	25	M	03-Nov-1876	Murder	Richard Coke
70	Eugene Catchings	Black	20	M	03-Nov-1876	Murder	Richard Coke
71	Convich S. Wood	unknown	–	M	10-Nov-1876	Murder	Richard Coke
1877 – 1 execution
72	John Singleton	White	22	M	27-Apr-1877	Robbery and Murder	Richard B. Hubbard
1878 – 14 executions
73	Brown Bowen	White	28	M	17-May-1878	Murder	Richard B. Hubbard
74	Fred Robertson	Black	22	M	31-May-1878	Rape	Richard B. Hubbard
75	Paolo Parras	Hispanic	–	M	28-Jun-1878	Murder	Richard B. Hubbard
76	George Solomon	Black	–	M	28-Jun-1878	Murder	Richard B. Hubbard
77	James Jones	Black	–	M	06-Jul-1878	Murder	Richard B. Hubbard
78	Amos Hadley	Native American	–	M	30-Aug-1878	Robbery and Murder	Richard B. Hubbard
79	Diomed Powell	Black	–	M	30-Aug-1878	Robbery and Murder	Richard B. Hubbard
80	John Speer	White	22	M	23-Sep-1878	Murder	Richard B. Hubbard
81	William P. Longley	White	27	M	11-Oct-1878	Murder	Richard B. Hubbard
82	Juan Antonio Hernandez	Hispanic	–	M	21-Nov-1878	Murder	Richard B. Hubbard
83	Smith Jackson	Black	–	M	14-Dec-1878	Murder	Richard B. Hubbard
84	Pryor Jones	Black	–	M	14-Dec-1878	Murder	Richard B. Hubbard
85	Green Johnson	Black	–	M	23-Dec-1878	Murder	Richard B. Hubbard
1879 – 12 executions							Richard B. Hubbard
86	Ezekiel Bradley	Black	–	M	02-May-1879	Murder	Oran Milo Roberts
87	José Cordova, Jr.	Hispanic	–	M	07-Jul-1879	Robbery and Murder	Oran Milo Roberts
88	Antonio Garcia	Hispanic	–	M	11-Jul-1879	Rape and murder	Oran Milo Roberts
89	Jacob Hainline	White	–	M	08-Aug-1879	Robbery and Murder	Oran Milo Roberts
90	Taylor Ake	Black	18	M	22-Aug-1879	Rape	Oran Milo Roberts
91	Charley Harris	unknown	–	M	29-Aug-1879	Murder	Oran Milo Roberts
92	Packett	Native American	–	M	12-Sep-1879	Murder	Oran Milo Roberts
93	Bill Davis	unknown	–	M	06-Nov-1879	Murder	Oran Milo Roberts
94	Julius Toetel	White	32	M	14-Nov-1879	Murder	Oran Milo Roberts
95	George Brown, Jr.	White	29	M	21-Nov-1879	Murder	Oran Milo Roberts
96	Andrew Brown	White	25	M	21-Nov-1879	Murder	Oran Milo Roberts
97	Cresencio Uvalte	Hispanic	–	M	28-Nov-1879	Multiple Murders	Oran Milo Roberts
Source: The Espy File: 1608–2002.

Preceded by List of people executed in Texas, 1860–1869	Lists of people executed in Texas	Succeeded by List of people executed in Texas, 1880–1889

== See also ==
- Capital punishment in Texas
