= Rutland Yeomanry Cavalry =

Yeomanry regiment of the British Army

The Rutland Yeomanry Cavalry was a yeomanry regiment of the British Army, raised in Rutland in 1794 and finally disbanded in 1828.

== History ==
The regiment was raised at the instigation of George Finch, 9th Earl of Winchilsea, and others following a meeting on 31 March 1794, at Oakham Castle, where it was resolved to form three troops of light dragoons. It was the first regiment to be accepted by the Crown as complete. Unlike the Leicestershire Yeomanry, it was not disbanded at the Treaty of Amiens in 1802 but renewed its services. In 1803 the Earl of Winchilsea also raised a rifle company which was attached to the Yeomanry, and together they became the Rutland Legion, a mixed force of volunteer cavalry and infantry. The rifle company was disbanded in 1813. When the Yeomanry was disbanded in 1828, the Leicestershire Yeomanry began to recruit from Rutland, and no subsequent yeomanry regiment was raised.

The Rutland Yeomanry should not be confused with the Rutland Fencible Cavalry, a different regiment also raised at this time. The Riding School built in Oakham for the Rutland Fencibles now houses the Rutland County Museum. It was built for the Rutland Fencibles by the MP Gerard Noel Edwards in 1794–1795.
