= List of people executed in the United States in 1924 =

One hundred and twenty-seven people, all male, were executed in the United States in 1924, sixty-nine by electrocution, fifty-six by hanging, one by firing squad, and one by gas chamber.

The execution of Gee Jon this year marked the first time a gas chamber was used as a method of execution in the United States.

== List of people executed in the United States in 1924 ==
No.	Date of execution	Name	Age of person			Gender	Ethnicity	State	Method	Ref.
No.	Date of execution	Name	At execution	At offense	Age difference	Gender	Ethnicity	State	Method	Ref.
1	January 4, 1924	Alexander A. Kels	39	38	1	Male	White	California	Hanging	
2	January 4, 1924	Edward C. Long	24	23	1	Male	White	Ohio	Electrocution	
3	January 4, 1924	George Parker	32	31	1	Male	White	Oregon	Hanging	
4	January 4, 1924	Philip Connizzaro	26	Unknown	Unknown	Male	White	West Virginia	Hanging	
5	January 4, 1924	Richard Ferri	26	Unknown	Unknown	Male	White	West Virginia	Hanging	
6	January 4, 1924	Nicholas Salamante	43	Unknown	Unknown	Male	White	West Virginia	Hanging	
7	January 13, 1924	Andrew Jackson "Jack" Pope	45	44	1	Male	White	Oklahoma	Electrocution	
8	January 13, 1924	Aaron Harvey	21	20	1	Male	White	Oklahoma	Electrocution	
9	January 15, 1924	Frank Sage	32	32	0	Male	White	New Jersey	Electrocution	
10	January 18, 1924	Roy Lee Maupin	26	24	2	Male	Black	Iowa	Hanging	
11	January 18, 1924	Omer Rosencrans Woods	48	46	2	Male	White	Utah	Firing squad	
12	January 28, 1924	Lawrence Roberts	26	25	1	Male	Black	Pennsylvania	Electrocution	
13	January 29, 1924	Angelino Carlino	39	36	3	Male	White	New Jersey	Electrocution	
14	January 29, 1924	Antonio Turco	36	33	3	Male	White	New Jersey	Electrocution	
15	February 1, 1924	John H. Nelson	28	27	1	Male	Black	Ohio	Electrocution	
16	February 1, 1924	Thomas Jefferson Chandler	37	35	2	Male	White	South Carolina	Electrocution	
17	February 3, 1924	Ed Farrar	Unknown	Unknown	Unknown	Male	White	Mississippi	Hanging	
18	February 8, 1924	Gee Jon	29	26	3	Male	Asian	Nevada	Gas chamber	
19	February 8, 1924	Milutin "Mike" Sipcich	56	55	1	Male	White	Ohio	Electrocution	
20	February 8, 1924	Melvin Johnson	19	Unknown	Unknown	Male	Black	Texas	Electrocution	
21	February 8, 1924	Mack Matthews	39	Unknown	Unknown	Male	Black	Texas	Electrocution	
22	February 8, 1924	Ewell Morris	22	Unknown	Unknown	Male	Black	Texas	Electrocution	
23	February 8, 1924	Charles Reynolds	27	Unknown	Unknown	Male	Black	Texas	Electrocution	
24	February 8, 1924	George Washington	38	Unknown	Unknown	Male	Black	Texas	Electrocution	
25	February 15, 1924	Samuel Muratore	42	Unknown	Unknown	Male	White	West Virginia	Hanging	
26	February 25, 1924	George Ware	24	21	3	Male	Black	Pennsylvania	Electrocution	
27	March 7, 1924	George Robertson	54	53	1	Male	Black	Alabama	Hanging	
28	March 7, 1924	Aurelio Pompa	23	21	2	Male	Hispanic	California	Hanging	
29	March 7, 1924	William T. Chambers	20	20	0	Male	Black	Kentucky	Electrocution	
30	March 10, 1924	Dominick Delfino	34	26	8	Male	White	Pennsylvania	Electrocution	
31	March 17, 1924	George H. Bland	32	31	1	Male	Black	Pennsylvania	Electrocution	
32	March 21, 1924	Bennie Cantelou	Unknown	Unknown	2	Male	Black	Alabama	Hanging	
33	March 22, 1924	Sylvester Garrett	Unknown	Unknown	1	Male	Black	Louisiana	Hanging	
34	March 28, 1924	William Hollis	24	23	1	Male	Black	Ohio	Electrocution	
35	March 28, 1924	Blaine Dyer	36	35	1	Male	Black	Texas	Electrocution	
36	March 28, 1924	Earnest Lawson	39	38	1	Male	Black	Texas	Electrocution	
37	March 31, 1924	Lorenzo Johnny Savage	25	24	1	Male	Black	Pennsylvania	Electrocution	
38	April 4, 1924	Levy James	Unknown	Unknown	Unknown	Male	Black	Louisiana	Hanging	
39	April 4, 1924	Booker T. Williams	19	19	0	Male	Black	Texas	Electrocution	
40	April 10, 1924	Antonio Viandante	41	39	2	Male	White	New York	Electrocution	
41	April 11, 1924	John V. Hendrix	53	51	2	Male	White	California	Hanging	
42	April 11, 1924	George Barber	Unknown	Unknown	Unknown	Male	Black	Illinois	Hanging	
43	April 11, 1924	James Marshall Alexander	Unknown	Unknown	2	Male	White	Louisiana	Hanging	
44	April 15, 1924	Clem Head	31	Unknown	Unknown	Male	Black	Ohio	Electrocution	
45	April 17, 1924	Reuben Norkin	32	30	2	Male	White	New York	Electrocution	
46	April 17, 1924	Tommie Curry	25	Unknown	Unknown	Male	Black	Texas	Electrocution	
47	April 18, 1924	Joe Sullivan	34	33	1	Male	White	Arkansas	Electrocution	
48	April 18, 1924	Lucius Dalton	Unknown	Unknown	0	Male	Black	Illinois	Hanging	
49	April 18, 1924	Henry Wilson	Unknown	Unknown	0	Male	Black	Illinois	Hanging	
50	April 21, 1924	William Albert Bringhurst	38	35	3	Male	White	California	Hanging	
51	April 21, 1924	Willard Thompson	40	37	3	Male	White	California	Hanging	
52	April 26, 1924	Joseph McGonigal	Unknown	Unknown	2	Male	White	Colorado	Hanging	
53	April 28, 1924	Charles Brooks	52	Unknown	Unknown	Male	Black	Ohio	Electrocution	
54	April 28, 1924	Wylie N. Morgan	28	26	2	Male	White	Pennsylvania	Electrocution	
55	April 28, 1924	Albert Platt	56	56	0	Male	White	Pennsylvania	Electrocution	
56	April 29, 1924	Luigi Rossi	33	33	0	Male	White	Ohio	Electrocution	
57	May 5, 1924	John F. Myma	27	25	2	Male	White	Pennsylvania	Electrocution	
58	May 9, 1924	Mariano Cazares	69	66	3	Male	Hispanic	California	Hanging	
59	May 9, 1924	Frank Thomas	71	68	3	Male	White	Kentucky	Electrocution	
60	May 9, 1924	George Washington Weick	50	49	1	Male	White	Kentucky	Electrocution	
61	May 9, 1924	Charles Miller	25	23	2	Male	Black	Kentucky	Electrocution	
62	May 9, 1924	Natale Deamore	41	38	3	Male	White	Louisiana	Hanging	
63	May 9, 1924	Roy Leona	36	33	3	Male	White	Louisiana	Hanging	
64	May 9, 1924	Joseph Bocchio	24	21	3	Male	White	Louisiana	Hanging	
65	May 9, 1924	Andrew Lemantia	35	32	3	Male	White	Louisiana	Hanging	
66	May 9, 1924	Joseph Giglio	33	30	3	Male	White	Louisiana	Hanging	
67	May 9, 1924	Joseph Rini	28	25	3	Male	White	Louisiana	Hanging	
68	May 22, 1924	Harle Humphreys	19	18	1	Male	Black	Texas	Electrocution	
69	May 23, 1924	Francisco Cadena	34	32	2	Male	Hispanic	Texas	Electrocution	
70	May 24, 1924	James Brown Satterfield	45	42	3	Male	White	Georgia	Hanging	
71	June 9, 1924	Edward Henderson	40	Unknown	Unknown	Male	Black	Texas	Electrocution	
72	June 12, 1924	Alberigo Mastrota	32	31	1	Male	White	New York	Electrocution	
73	June 13, 1924	George Edward Whitfield	22	20	2	Male	White	Washington	Hanging	
74	June 20, 1924	William B. Ward	38	37	1	Male	Black	Arizona	Hanging	
75	June 20, 1924	Charlie Simuel	25	37	1	Male	Black	South Carolina	Electrocution	
76	June 23, 1924	Walter Grymkowski	35	37	1	Male	White	Pennsylvania	Electrocution	
77	June 23, 1924	Martin Matlovski	32	31	1	Male	White	Pennsylvania	Electrocution	
78	June 24, 1924	Vincenzo Caparra	33	32	1	Male	White	Ohio	Electrocution	
79	June 27, 1924	Will Bettis	35	35	0	Male	Black	Arkansas	Electrocution	
80	June 27, 1924	Spurgeon Rucks	30	30	0	Male	Black	Arkansas	Electrocution	
81	June 27, 1924	Ralph Michael Waller	34	34	0	Male	White	Washington	Hanging	
82	June 30, 1924	Joseph Trinkle	22	20	2	Male	White	Pennsylvania	Electrocution	
83	July 7, 1924	John A. Dailey	35	Unknown	Unknown	Male	White	Pennsylvania	Electrocution	
84	July 11, 1924	Gordon Frank Fincher	30	29	1	Male	White	Alabama	Hanging	
85	July 15, 1924	Edward M. Allen	26	Unknown	Unknown	Male	White	New Jersey	Electrocution	
86	July 15, 1924	Anthony Bagdonowitz	24	23	1	Male	White	New Jersey	Electrocution	
87	July 15, 1924	Tony Briglia	25	Unknown	Unknown	Male	White	New Jersey	Electrocution	
88	July 15, 1924	Frank W. Taylor	39	Unknown	Unknown	Male	White	New Jersey	Electrocution	
89	July 18, 1924	Charles Merrill	21	19	2	Male	White	Missouri	Hanging	
90	July 18, 1924	Hugh Pinkley	35	32	3	Male	White	Missouri	Hanging	
91	July 18, 1924	Seth Orrin Danner	42	38	4	Male	White	Montana	Hanging	
92	July 22, 1924	Anthony Staub	59	Unknown	Unknown	Male	White	New Jersey	Electrocution	
93	July 24, 1924	Eulogia Lozado	26	25	1	Male	Asian	New York	Electrocution	
94	July 25, 1924	Frank Taylor Atkinson	36	35	1	Male	White	Mississippi	Hanging	
95	July 25, 1924	Clyde Lee Greer	37	36	1	Male	White	Mississippi	Hanging	
96	July 30, 1924	Cyrille J. Vandenhecke	51	45	6	Male	White	Massachusetts	Electrocution	
97	August 1, 1924	Alto Hamilton	Unknown	Unknown	1	Male	Black	Louisiana	Hanging	
98	August 8, 1924	Alonzo Myhand	29	Unknown	Unknown	Male	Black	Alabama	Hanging	
99	August 8, 1924	Porter William Myhand	26	Unknown	Unknown	Male	Black	Alabama	Hanging	
100	August 8, 1924	Euzebe Vidrine	26	25	1	Male	White	Louisiana	Hanging	
101	August 15, 1924	Alseyo Franklin Champion	29	26	3	Male	White	California	Hanging	
102	August 15, 1924	Harrison Brown	15	15	0	Male	Black	Georgia	Hanging	
103	August 22, 1924	Martin "Mike" Sliskovich	30	28	2	Male	White	California	Hanging	
104	September 5, 1924	Richard Adolphus Birkes	27	26	1	Male	White	Oklahoma	Electrocution	
105	September 12, 1924	Otto Clear	18	18	0	Male	Black	Virginia	Electrocution	
106	September 12, 1924	Fritz Lewis	17	17	0	Male	Black	Virginia	Electrocution	
107	September 12, 1924	Tiny McCoy	23	23	0	Male	White	West Virginia	Hanging	
108	September 13, 1924	Howard Hinton	20	Unknown	Unknown	Male	Black	Georgia	Electrocution	
109	September 19, 1924	Warren Waters	56	55	1	Male	White	Georgia	Hanging	
110	October 3, 1924	Booker T. Boone	23	23	0	Male	Black	Louisiana	Hanging	
111	October 3, 1924	Freeman Coleman	Unknown	Unknown	0	Male	Black	Louisiana	Hanging	
112	October 3, 1924	Willie Washington	Unknown	Unknown	0	Male	Black	Louisiana	Hanging	
113	October 7, 1924	Frank Johnson	19	18	1	Male	Black	Florida	Electrocution	
114	October 10, 1924	Ed Kirby	57	55	2	Male	Black	Texas	Electrocution	
115	November 7, 1924	Rubin Robinson	Unknown	Unknown	Unknown	Male	Black	South Carolina	Electrocution	
116	November 14, 1924	Harry Diamond	26	25	1	Male	White	Indiana	Electrocution	
117	November 28, 1924	Vance Morgan	22	Unknown	Unknown	Male	Black	North Carolina	Electrocution	
118	December 5, 1924	James Avant	41	41	0	Male	Black	Ohio	Electrocution	
119	December 5, 1924	Frank Harrell	24	24	0	Male	White	South Carolina	Electrocution	
120	December 5, 1924	Mortimer Nelson King Sr.	23	23	0	Male	White	South Carolina	Electrocution	
121	December 12, 1924	Robert Matthew	24	23	1	Male	Black	California	Hanging	
122	December 12, 1924	Alfred Sharpe	23	23	0	Male	Black	Louisiana	Hanging	
123	December 12, 1924	Alexander Kuszik	19	Unknown	Unknown	Male	White	Ohio	Electrocution	
124	December 12, 1924	Thomas M. Walton	39	38	1	Male	White	Washington	Hanging	
125	December 19, 1924	Joseph Sinuel	23	22	1	Male	Black	California	Hanging	
126	December 19, 1924	Noah Arnold	32	31	1	Male	Black	Idaho	Hanging	
127	December 22, 1924	Lester Ferdinand Kahl	24	24	0	Male	White	Illinois	Hanging	

== Demographics ==
Gender
Male	127	100%
Female	0	0%
Ethnicity
White	70	55%
Black	52	41%
Hispanic	3	2%
Asian	2	2%
State
Louisiana	15	12%
Texas	13	10%
Pennsylvania	12	9%
California	10	8%
Ohio	10	8%
New Jersey	8	6%
Alabama	5	4%
South Carolina	5	4%
West Virginia	5	4%
Georgia	4	3%
Illinois	4	3%
Kentucky	4	3%
New York	4	3%
Arkansas	3	2%
Mississippi	3	2%
Oklahoma	3	2%
Washington	3	2%
Missouri	2	2%
Virginia	2	2%
Arizona	1	1%
Colorado	1	1%
Florida	1	1%
Idaho	1	1%
Indiana	1	1%
Iowa	1	1%
Massachusetts	1	1%
Montana	1	1%
Nevada	1	1%
North Carolina	1	1%
Oregon	1	1%
Utah	1	1%
Method
Electrocution	69	54%
Hanging	56	44%
Firing squad	1	1%
Gas chamber	1	1%
Month
January	14	11%
February	12	9%
March	11	9%
April	19	15%
May	14	11%
June	12	9%
July	14	11%
August	7	6%
September	6	5%
October	5	4%
November	3	2%
December	10	8%
Age
Unknown	13	10%
10–19	8	6%
20–29	45	35%
30–39	38	30%
40–49	11	9%
50–59	10	8%
60–69	1	1%
70–79	1	1%
Total	127	100%

== Executions in recent years ==
Number of executions
1925	144
1924	127
1923	114
Total	385

Preceded by 1923	List of people executed in the United States in 1924	Succeeded by 1925
