= List of people executed in the United States in 1921 =

One hundred and forty-three people, all male, were executed in the United States in 1921, seventy-eight by electrocution, and sixty-five by hanging.

== List of people executed in the United States in 1921 ==
No.	Date of execution	Name	Age of person			Gender	Ethnicity	State	Method	Ref.
No.	Date of execution	Name	At execution	At offense	Age difference	Gender	Ethnicity	State	Method	Ref.
1	January 7, 1921	Joszef Deli	25	24	1	Male	White	Ohio	Electrocution	
2	January 7, 1921	Robert O'Neil	26	Unknown	Unknown	Male	Black	Ohio	Electrocution	
3	January 14, 1921	Pedro Dominguez	27	27	0	Male	Hispanic	Arizona	Hanging	
4	January 20, 1921	Charles Cross	27	Unknown	Unknown	Male	Black	Ohio	Electrocution	
5	January 21, 1921	Robert Edwards	21	20	1	Male	Black	Alabama	Hanging	
6	January 21, 1921	Ernest Williams	Unknown	Unknown	Unknown	Male	Black	Alabama	Hanging	
7	January 27, 1921	Enrique Garcia	38	36	2	Male	Hispanic	New York	Electrocution	
8	January 27, 1921	Augustin L. Sanchez	33	31	2	Male	Hispanic	New York	Electrocution	
9	January 31, 1921	Lee Ellison	45	45	0	Male	Black	Kentucky	Electrocution	
10	February 1, 1921	Philip Schilling	29	28	1	Male	White	New Jersey	Electrocution	
11	February 4, 1921	Dan Charley	Unknown	Unknown	2	Male	Black	Alabama	Hanging	
12	February 4, 1921	James C. Clark	43	41	2	Male	White	California	Hanging	
13	February 4, 1921	Will Lomax	27	26	1	Male	Black	South Carolina	Electrocution	
14	February 10, 1921	Jesse Edward Walker	20	19	1	Male	White	New York	Electrocution	
15	February 11, 1921	Edward J. Brislane	30	29	1	Male	White	Illinois	Hanging	
16	February 11, 1921	Settimi DeSantis	37	36	1	Male	White	Illinois	Hanging	
17	February 18, 1921	Ernest Nakis	34	32	2	Male	White	California	Hanging	
18	February 18, 1921	Ivey Littlejohn	27	25	2	Male	Black	South Carolina	Electrocution	
19	February 25, 1921	Laodis Lincoln	35	Unknown	Unknown	Male	Black	Louisiana	Hanging	
20	February 25, 1921	Charles Robert Robinson	16	16	0	Male	Black	Maryland	Hanging	
21	February 25, 1921	Felix Bell	Unknown	Unknown	2	Male	Black	Maryland	Hanging	
22	February 25, 1921	Robert Washington Blakely	39	39	0	Male	White	Oklahoma	Electrocution	
23	February 25, 1921	John G. Ledbetter	31	30	1	Male	Native American	Oklahoma	Electrocution	
24	February 28, 1921	James Davis	Unknown	Unknown	3	Male	Black	Pennsylvania	Electrocution	
25	March 3, 1921	Guy Nichols	24	23	1	Male	White	New York	Electrocution	
26	March 4, 1921	Adam Griffin	40	39	1	Male	Black	South Carolina	Electrocution	
27	March 5, 1921	John Williams	27	Unknown	Unknown	Male	Black	Virginia	Electrocution	
28	March 11, 1921	William Henry Campbell	22	21	1	Male	Black	District of Columbia	Hanging	
29	March 11, 1921	Yee Geow	25	24	1	Male	Asian	Wyoming	Hanging	
30	March 15, 1921	Stephen Carrigan	35	33	2	Male	White	New Jersey	Electrocution	
31	March 18, 1921	William Davis	Unknown	Unknown	1	Male	Black	Maryland	Hanging	
32	March 18, 1921	Charles Lewis	Unknown	Unknown	1	Male	Black	Maryland	Hanging	
33	March 18, 1921	Albert Howard	19	19	0	Male	Black	Texas	Hanging	
34	March 21, 1921	William Hopkins	21	21	0	Male	Black	North Carolina	Electrocution	
35	March 25, 1921	Richard "Freddie" Fogle	14	14	0	Male	Black	South Carolina	Electrocution	
36	April 1, 1921	Johann Schmitt	26	26	0	Male	White	Washington	Hanging	
37	April 8, 1921	Giles Sydnor	24	Unknown	Unknown	Male	Black	Virginia	Electrocution	
38	April 15, 1921	Mailo Segura	29	26	3	Male	White	Federal government	Hanging	
39	April 15, 1921	Sam Cardinella	26	25	1	Male	White	Illinois	Hanging	
40	April 15, 1921	Joseph Costanzo	30	29	1	Male	White	Illinois	Hanging	
41	April 15, 1921	Sam Ferrara	26	25	1	Male	White	Illinois	Hanging	
42	April 15, 1921	Francis Jenkins Lowhone	36	34	2	Male	White	Illinois	Hanging	
43	April 15, 1921	Guy Vernon Thompson	41	40	1	Male	White	Maryland	Hanging	
44	April 15, 1921	Lester Eugene Gandy	27	Unknown	Unknown	Male	White	Mississippi	Hanging	
45	April 15, 1921	Jesse James Watts	34	33	1	Male	White	Mississippi	Hanging	
46	April 18, 1921	Antonio Insano	45	44	1	Male	White	Pennsylvania	Electrocution	
47	April 22, 1921	Gus Bracy	Unknown	Unknown	Unknown	Male	Black	Louisiana	Hanging	
48	April 22, 1921	Earl R. Holmes	19	19	0	Male	White	Louisiana	Hanging	
49	April 22, 1921	John R. Parker	22	22	0	Male	White	Louisiana	Hanging	
50	April 25, 1921	Clarence Raymond Collins	21	18	3	Male	White	Pennsylvania	Electrocution	
51	April 25, 1921	Charles Clinton Reinecker	20	17	3	Male	White	Pennsylvania	Electrocution	
52	April 29, 1921	Revertia Reynolds	21	Unknown	Unknown	Male	Black	Arkansas	Electrocution	
53	April 29, 1921	James Louis O'Dell	25	24	1	Male	White	New York	Electrocution	
54	May 3, 1921	Albert Wilson	Unknown	Unknown	1	Male	Black	South Carolina	Electrocution	
55	May 5, 1921	Michael Casalino	39	36	3	Male	White	New York	Electrocution	
56	May 6, 1921	Joe Berry	25	Unknown	Unknown	Male	Black	Louisiana	Hanging	
57	May 16, 1921	Charles Byrd	20	18	2	Male	Black	Pennsylvania	Electrocution	
58	May 16, 1921	Timothy Green	23	Unknown	Unknown	Male	Black	Pennsylvania	Electrocution	
59	May 20, 1921	Elwood Birdsey Wade	24	23	1	Male	White	Connecticut	Hanging	
60	May 20, 1921	Tom Brown	Unknown	Unknown	1	Male	Black	Florida	Hanging	
61	May 23, 1921	John Currey	24	23	1	Male	Black	Pennsylvania	Electrocution	
62	May 23, 1921	George Cox Tompkins	39	35	4	Male	White	Pennsylvania	Electrocution	
63	May 27, 1921	John Kaurawskas	36	36	0	Male	White	Connecticut	Hanging	
64	May 27, 1921	Luke Frazier	35	34	1	Male	Black	North Carolina	Electrocution	
65	May 28, 1921	Charles Rehfeld	42	41	1	Male	White	Ohio	Electrocution	
66	June 2, 1921	Senbichi Ichioka	61	Unknown	Unknown	Male	Asian	Hawaii Territory	Hanging	
67	June 2, 1921	Dick Howell	43	41	2	Male	White	Ohio	Electrocution	
68	June 3, 1921	George C. Williams	53	Unknown	Unknown	Male	White	California	Hanging	
69	June 17, 1921	Virgil Clarke	36	Unknown	Unknown	Male	Black	Arkansas	Electrocution	
70	June 17, 1921	Felix John Birbiglia	22	21	1	Male	White	Louisiana	Hanging	
71	June 17, 1921	Charles Jones Zalenka	20	19	1	Male	White	Louisiana	Hanging	
72	June 20, 1921	Milton Hudson	30	29	1	Male	Black	Pennsylvania	Electrocution	
73	June 20, 1921	William Stragin	31	30	1	Male	Black	Pennsylvania	Electrocution	
74	June 20, 1921	Steve Schiop	35	34	1	Male	White	Pennsylvania	Electrocution	
75	June 20, 1921	Robert Trammel	36	35	1	Male	Black	Pennsylvania	Electrocution	
76	June 24, 1921	William Turner	50	49	1	Male	Black	Federal government	Hanging	
77	June 24, 1921	Oscar McGavick	Unknown	Unknown	1	Male	Black	Illinois	Hanging	
78	June 24, 1921	Grover Cleveland Redding	45	44	1	Male	Black	Illinois	Hanging	
79	July 1, 1921	Royce Richardson	32	32	0	Male	Black	Ohio	Electrocution	
80	July 8, 1921	Antonio Lopez	26	25	1	Male	Hispanic	Illinois	Hanging	
81	July 15, 1921	Harry Ward	25	24	1	Male	White	Illinois	Hanging	
82	July 15, 1921	Eli Thomas	22	21	1	Male	Black	Oklahoma	Electrocution	
83	July 21, 1921	John P. Bulge	27	26	1	Male	Black	New York	Electrocution	
84	July 21, 1921	Jose Flores	17	16	1	Male	Hispanic	Texas	Hanging	
85	July 21, 1921	Jordan Israel	40	39	1	Male	Black	Texas	Hanging	
86	July 22, 1921	Jacob Lutz	48	48	0	Male	White	West Virginia	Hanging	
87	July 25, 1921	Joseph Allen	Unknown	Unknown	Unknown	Male	White	Pennsylvania	Electrocution	
88	July 26, 1921	Frederick Pierson	40	Unknown	Unknown	Male	Black	New Jersey	Electrocution	
89	August 3, 1921	Cyrenas J. Jackson	18	17	1	Male	Black	Tennessee	Electrocution	
90	August 3, 1921	Taylor Neal	19	18	1	Male	Black	Tennessee	Electrocution	
91	August 5, 1921	Hobart E. Grimm	23	22	1	Male	White	West Virginia	Hanging	
92	August 12, 1921	Charles William Jocoy	23	22	1	Male	White	Missouri	Hanging	
93	August 17, 1921	Will Allen	Unknown	Unknown	1	Male	Black	Tennessee	Electrocution	
94	August 17, 1921	Hamp Gholson	Unknown	Unknown	Unknown	Male	Black	Tennessee	Electrocution	
95	August 17, 1921	Chesley Graham	Unknown	Unknown	1	Male	Black	Tennessee	Electrocution	
96	August 17, 1921	Lee Walker	Unknown	Unknown	Unknown	Male	Black	Missouri	Hanging	
97	August 23, 1921	Harold V. Lamble	29	26	3	Male	White	New Jersey	Electrocution	
98	August 23, 1921	William J. Fitzsimmons	32	31	1	Male	White	New Jersey	Electrocution	
99	August 26, 1921	Richard Davis	72	71	1	Male	Black	Alabama	Hanging	
100	August 26, 1921	Will Morton	Unknown	Unknown	Unknown	Male	Black	Alabama	Hanging	
101	August 26, 1921	John Whiteside	Unknown	Unknown	0	Male	Black	Alabama	Hanging	
102	August 26, 1921	Albert Yick	29	28	1	Male	White	Montana	Hanging	
103	August 29, 1921	Frank Motto	24	24	0	Male	White	Ohio	Electrocution	
104	August 30, 1921	Frank J. James	35	34	1	Male	White	New Jersey	Electrocution	
105	August 30, 1921	Raymond P. Schuck	29	28	1	Male	White	New Jersey	Electrocution	
106	September 1, 1921	Henry Alfred Brown	19	19	0	Male	Black	Federal government	Hanging	
107	September 1, 1921	Angelo Giordano	42	38	4	Male	White	New York	Electrocution	
108	September 1, 1921	Harry B. Van Reed	36	35	1	Male	White	New York	Electrocution	
109	September 2, 1921	Pink Griffin	23	23	0	Male	Black	South Carolina	Electrocution	
110	September 9, 1921	Nichan Martin	25	22	3	Male	White	Arizona	Hanging	
111	September 9, 1921	Sylvester Brown	27	27	0	Male	Black	Ohio	Electrocution	
112	September 12, 1921	John William Carroll Jr.	23	22	1	Male	White	Missouri	Hanging	
113	September 15, 1921	Clyde Thomas	35	35	0	Male	Black	Alabama	Hanging	
114	September 15, 1921	Edward J. McNally	30	Unknown	Unknown	Male	White	New York	Electrocution	
115	September 20, 1921	Andrew Davy	38	37	1	Male	White	Ohio	Electrocution	
116	September 23, 1921	Jacob Benjamin Martin	33	33	0	Male	White	Florida	Hanging	
117	September 23, 1921	Francis Putnam Ponsell	25	24	1	Male	White	Florida	Hanging	
118	September 26, 1921	William Knight	24	Unknown	Unknown	Male	Black	Pennsylvania	Electrocution	
119	September 30, 1921	Carl Otto Wanderer	26	24	2	Male	White	Illinois	Hanging	
120	September 30, 1921	John Cooper	41	40	1	Male	Black	Ohio	Electrocution	
121	September 30, 1921	Judge Griffith	22	22	0	Male	Black	Virginia	Electrocution	
122	September 30, 1921	Raleigh Haskins	18	18	0	Male	Black	Virginia	Electrocution	
123	October 3, 1921	Love Wilson	22	20	2	Male	Black	Pennsylvania	Electrocution	
124	October 7, 1921	John Doe Hamilton	Unknown	Unknown	Unknown	Male	Native American	Federal government	Hanging	
125	October 7, 1921	Henry Harbor	29	Unknown	Unknown	Male	Black	West Virginia	Hanging	
126	October 10, 1921	Frank Henderson	34	33	1	Male	White	North Carolina	Electrocution	
127	October 14, 1921	Amos Henry Ratliff	25	24	1	Male	White	Arkansas	Electrocution	
128	October 20, 1921	James T. Harris	53	52	1	Male	White	North Carolina	Electrocution	
129	October 21, 1921	David Clifton	36	35	1	Male	Black	California	Hanging	
130	October 21, 1921	John Edward Christmas	27	27	0	Male	Black	Illinois	Hanging	
131	October 24, 1921	Domenico Diaco	32	28	4	Male	White	Pennsylvania	Electrocution	
132	October 31, 1921	Harry Caldwell	33	32	1	Male	Black	North Carolina	Electrocution	
133	November 4, 1921	Harvey Whaley	40	40	0	Male	Black	South Carolina	Electrocution	
134	November 9, 1921	Frank Ligreni	Unknown	Unknown	1	Male	White	Illinois	Hanging	
135	November 21, 1921	William Young Westmoreland	39	38	1	Male	White	North Carolina	Electrocution	
136	November 28, 1921	Frank Palma	Unknown	Unknown	2	Male	White	Pennsylvania	Electrocution	
137	November 30, 1921	Claude Morehead	Unknown	Unknown	Unknown	Male	Black	North Carolina	Electrocution	
138	December 2, 1921	Henry Barnett	Unknown	Unknown	Unknown	Male	Black	Alabama	Hanging	
139	December 2, 1921	Willie Williams	Unknown	Unknown	Unknown	Male	Black	Alabama	Hanging	
140	December 2, 1921	Tillman Choice	30	Unknown	Unknown	Male	Black	South Carolina	Electrocution	
141	December 9, 1921	Wilmer Amos Hadley	39	36	3	Male	White	Virginia	Electrocution	
142	December 15, 1921	George Brazee	59	58	1	Male	White	New York	Electrocution	
143	December 30, 1921	John Price	20	Unknown	Unknown	Male	Black	Arkansas	Electrocution	

== Demographics ==
Gender
Male	143	100%
Female	0	0%
Ethnicity
Black	70	49%
White	64	45%
Hispanic	5	3%
Asian	2	1%
Native American	2	1%
State
Pennsylvania	17	12%
Illinois	13	9%
New York	11	8%
Ohio	10	7%
Alabama	9	6%
South Carolina	8	6%
Louisiana	7	5%
New Jersey	7	5%
North Carolina	7	5%
Maryland	5	3%
Tennessee	5	3%
Virginia	5	3%
Arkansas	4	3%
California	4	3%
Federal government	4	3%
Florida	3	2%
Missouri	3	1%
Oklahoma	3	2%
Texas	3	2%
West Virginia	3	2%
Arizona	2	1%
Connecticut	2	1%
Mississippi	2	1%
District of Columbia	1	1%
Hawaii Territory	1	1%
Kentucky	1	1%
Montana	1	1%
Washington	1	1%
Wyoming	1	1%
Method
Electrocution	78	55%
Hanging	65	45%
Month
January	9	6%
February	15	10%
March	11	8%
April	18	13%
May	12	8%
June	13	9%
July	10	7%
August	17	12%
September	17	12%
October	10	7%
November	5	3%
December	6	4%
Age
Unknown	23	16%
10–19	9	6%
20–29	55	38%
30–39	36	25%
40–49	14	10%
50–59	4	3%
60–69	1	1%
70–79	1	1%
Total	143	100%

== Executions in recent years ==
Number of executions
1922	148
1921	143
1920	103
Total	394

Preceded by 1920	List of people executed in the United States in 1921	Succeeded by 1922
