= Execution of Roy Mitchell =

1923 public hanging in Texas, US

Roy Mitchell (1892 – July 30, 1923) was an African-American serial killer from Waco, Texas who was convicted of six murders and executed in 1923. His arrest, trial, conviction, and execution are considered an example of continued bigotry in the Texas judicial system of the 1920s, but also of reforms aimed at curbing mob violence and public lynching. Mitchell was the penultimate person to be executed by hanging in Texas before the introduction of the electric chair there.

== Background ==
Waco was a prosperous town in the early 20th century and home to a substantial African-American population, which included a small middle class. Racial tensions in the town were high and reached a fever pitch in 1916 with the public lynching of Jesse Washington, who had been accused and summarily convicted of murdering a white woman. Following an investigation and the publication of photographs of Washington's lynching by the NAACP, Waco authorities were under political pressure to discourage further instances of mob violence. The next lynching occurred in Waco in 1921, the victim in this case a disabled white man named Curley Hackney.

In 1919, Texas had more lynchings than any state except Georgia. Within the United States, 38 people were lynched in 1917, 64 in 1918, and 83 in 1919; lynchings did not begin to substantially decline until the 1930s. The Ku Klux Klan was especially popular in the early 1920s, with as many as 170,000 members in Texas. In December 1921, Waco and 54th District Judge Richard I. Munroe gave a speech in which he condemned mob violence, declaring that all those who participated in lynching were themselves guilty of murder. Nevertheless, Klan support increased in Waco and throughout Texas in 1922, and another man was lynched in that year.

In the spring of 1922, Waco was beset by hysteria after a number of couples were attacked in public places. On May 25, Harold Bolton was killed and his companion raped. On May 27, a neighbor kidnapped Jesse Thomas, a black service car driver, who was then declared to be Bolton's killer and murdered by local Sam Harris. His body was subsequently mutilated by a mob.

== Trial and execution ==
On January 29, 1923, Roy Mitchell was arrested by Waco authorities after a friend named Jesse Wedlow told local Sheriff Leslie Stegall that he believed a cap, left behind by a fleeing attacker, may have belonged to Mitchell. Stegall and authorities described Mitchell as "a yellow negro with gold filled front teeth, speaks good language." Police first claimed that Mitchell had been known to them for months, then years.

Told to confess because of the great evidence held against him, Mitchell replied that with so much evidence, the prosecution would not need his confession. During interrogation, Mitchell confessed to five murders, four rapes, and three assaults, including crimes of which Jesse Thomas had been accused and killed. Newspapers attributed his crimes to "robbery and lust." At his first trial however, Mitchell recanted his confessions, stating that he had been tortured with beatings, pins, matches, and the threat of lynching by a mob. One source claims that Mitchell may have been coerced into confession through fear, superstition, and psychological manipulation.

Each of Mitchell's trials, held in March 1923, resulted in jury convictions after deliberations that lasted "minutes." Mitchell's wife Minnie and 10-year-old daughter, Marguerite, accompanied him at each trial and testified that he had been at home. After being convicted and sentenced to death for all charges brought against him, Mitchell confessed to the murders of W. H. Barker, his wife, Lula Barker, and a boy named Homer Turk on February 11, 1922. However, two other black men, Cooper Johnson and Bennie Young, had already confessed to committing these crimes during interrogations. Johnson was sentenced to death and Bennie Young was sentenced to life in prison. Johnson received an indefinite stay of execution after Mitchell confessed to the murders. He died in prison from a terminal illness on July 26, 1923. Young was pardoned by the governor in 1934.

Waco mayor Ben C. Richards and Sheriff Stegall publicly announced their intention to protect Mitchell from mob violence until his execution. Immediately prior to his execution, Mitchell again confessed to all crimes of which he had been convicted. On July 30, 1923, Mitchell calmly said "Goodbye, everyone," and was hanged at McLennan County Jail before a crowd of 4–5,000 people. Mitchell is normally described as the last man to be legally hanged in the United States. Nevertheless, Waco historian Thomas E. Turner has written that Mitchell was in fact the penultimate to be executed by hanging in Texas, and that in the month following Mitchell's death, Nathan Lee was quietly hanged in Angleton's Brazoria courthouse.

== Aftermath ==
Historian Patricia Bernstein has argued that Mitchell's protection from lynching and legal execution, while judicially flawed, demonstrated the effectiveness of the NAACP's anti-lynching campaign.

== See also ==
- Capital punishment in Texas
- List of people executed in Texas, 1920–1929
- List of people executed in the United States in 1923
- Lynching of Jesse Washington

== Bibliography ==
- Bernstein, Patricia (2005). The First Waco Horror. College Station: Texas A&M University Press.
- Morgan, Hazel (1921). A "Two-Gun" Man of the Law. Nacognoches: The Texas History Teacher's Bulletin.
- Blackburn, Edward (2006). Wanted: Historic County Jails of Texas. College Park: Texas A&M University Press.
- Wood, Amy (2009). Lynching and Spectacle: Witnessing Racial Violence in America, 1890-1940. Chapel Hill: University of North Carolina Press.
- Biffle, Kent (15 February 1998). "Waco's claim to last hanging stretches truth". Dallas Morning News.
