= List of people executed in the United States in 1927 =

One hundred and thirty-nine people, all male, were executed in the United States in 1927, ninety-eight by electrocution and forty-one by hanging.

== List of people executed in the United States in 1927 ==
No.	Date of execution	Name	Age of person			Gender	Ethnicity	State	Method	Ref.
No.	Date of execution	Name	At execution	At offense	Age difference	Gender	Ethnicity	State	Method	Ref.
1	January 6, 1927	Edward J. Heinlein	26	25	1	Male	White	Massachusetts	Electrocution	
2	January 6, 1927	John Joseph Devereaux	25	24	1	Male	White	Massachusetts	Electrocution	
3	January 6, 1927	John J. McLaughlin	31	30	1	Male	White	Massachusetts	Electrocution	
4	January 6, 1927	Charles Goldson	23	22	1	Male	Black	New York	Electrocution	
5	January 6, 1927	Edgar Humes	26	25	1	Male	Black	New York	Electrocution	
6	January 6, 1927	George Williams	27	26	1	Male	Black	New York	Electrocution	
7	January 7, 1927	William J. Slater	24	23	1	Male	White	California	Hanging	
8	January 8, 1927	Robert Franklin Thompson	54	54	0	Male	White	Ohio	Electrocution	
9	January 11, 1927	Peter Doro	32	31	1	Male	White	New Jersey	Electrocution	
10	January 13, 1927	Benjamin Bradley	28	27	1	Male	Black	New York	Electrocution	
11	January 14, 1927	William Gee	21	Unknown	Unknown	Male	Black	Virginia	Electrocution	
12	January 20, 1927	Michael Kosmowski	35	33	2	Male	White	New York	Electrocution	
13	January 21, 1927	Sydney Adams	40	39	1	Male	Black	California	Hanging	
14	January 28, 1927	Raymond H. Arnold	29	26	3	Male	White	California	Hanging	
15	February 4, 1927	Edward K. Sayer	24	22	2	Male	White	California	Hanging	
16	February 16, 1927	Joseph Smith	51	51	0	Male	White	Illinois	Hanging	
17	February 17, 1927	Paul Emanuel Hilton	27	26	1	Male	White	New York	Electrocution	
18	February 17, 1927	Anthony Paretti	35	25	10	Male	White	New York	Electrocution	
19	February 18, 1927	Oscar Quarles	Unknown	Unknown	Unknown	Male	Black	Illinois	Hanging	
20	February 18, 1927	F.D. Baines	27	Unknown	Unknown	Male	Black	Texas	Electrocution	
21	February 18, 1927	Pierce Jefferies	21	Unknown	Unknown	Male	Black	West Virginia	Hanging	
22	February 28, 1927	Walter Francis Webb	28	27	1	Male	Black	Pennsylvania	Electrocution	
23	February 28, 1927	Amos Hughes	25	24	1	Male	Black	Pennsylvania	Electrocution	
24	March 1, 1927	Lloyd O'Dell Salter	28	27	1	Male	Black	Florida	Electrocution	
25	March 7, 1927	Joseph Curry	28	28	0	Male	White	Pennsylvania	Electrocution	
26	March 7, 1927	Harry Bentley	23	22	1	Male	White	Pennsylvania	Electrocution	
27	March 7, 1927	William Juliano	27	26	1	Male	White	Pennsylvania	Electrocution	
28	March 7, 1927	Frank Doris	24	24	0	Male	White	Pennsylvania	Electrocution	
29	March 8, 1927	Raymond Stone	26	25	1	Male	Black	Florida	Electrocution	
30	March 11, 1927	Robert Lumpkin	27	25	2	Male	Black	North Carolina	Electrocution	
31	March 17, 1927	Giuseppe W. Provenzano	24	22	2	Male	White	New York	Electrocution	
32	March 17, 1927	Giuseppe Friia	33	31	2	Male	White	New York	Electrocution	
33	March 17, 1927	Bryant Satchell	25	24	1	Male	Black	Texas	Electrocution	
34	March 23, 1927	Rufus Linias Chesser	19	17	2	Male	White	Florida	Electrocution	
35	March 31, 1927	Scott Workman	42	42	0	Male	White	Ohio	Electrocution	
36	April 7, 1927	Earl London	Unknown	Unknown	1	Male	Black	Florida	Electrocution	
37	April 8, 1927	Horace D. DeVaughn	34	33	1	Male	Black	Alabama	Electrocution	
38	April 8, 1927	James D. Lyon	27	26	1	Male	White	Ohio	Electrocution	
39	April 8, 1927	George William Thoma	23	23	0	Male	White	Ohio	Electrocution	
40	April 15, 1927	John Walton Winn	47	45	2	Male	White	Illinois	Hanging	
41	April 15, 1927	Henry Porfey	21	Unknown	Unknown	Male	Black	Virginia	Electrocution	
42	April 15, 1927	William Thomas	23	Unknown	Unknown	Male	Black	Virginia	Electrocution	
43	April 22, 1927	Ernest Walker	39	38	1	Male	Black	North Carolina	Electrocution	
44	April 23, 1927	William Virgil Murphy	37	36	1	Male	White	Alabama	Electrocution	
45	April 27, 1927	Fortune Ferguson Jr.	22	17	5	Male	Black	Florida	Electrocution	
46	April 29, 1927	Thomas Twine	35	35	0	Male	Black	Illinois	Hanging	
47	April 29, 1927	Henry Evans Bartlett	37	34	3	Male	White	Nebraska	Electrocution	
48	May 17, 1927	Paul William Feursten	45	44	1	Male	White	New Jersey	Electrocution	
49	May 17, 1927	Albert Brownlee	28	28	0	Male	White	Oregon	Hanging	
50	May 20, 1927	Charles Jehu Blackburn	36	35	1	Male	White	Arizona	Hanging	
51	May 20, 1927	Ferdinand Schlaps	19	18	1	Male	White	Montana	Hanging	
52	May 20, 1927	John F. Webb	Unknown	Unknown	Unknown	Male	Black	Tennessee	Electrocution	
53	May 20, 1927	Matthew Briscoe	37	34	3	Male	Black	Texas	Electrocution	
54	May 25, 1927	John Henry Wallace	21	19	2	Male	Black	Tennessee	Electrocution	
55	May 27, 1927	Carl Skinner	27	27	0	Male	Black	Delaware	Hanging	
56	May 27, 1927	Narciso Reyes	34	Unknown	Unknown	Male	Asian	Hawaii Territory	Hanging	
57	May 27, 1927	Marcelo Rivera	23	22	1	Male	Asian	Hawaii Territory	Hanging	
58	May 27, 1927	Alfred A. Winters	30	28	2	Male	Black	Washington	Hanging	
59	June 3, 1927	Merrell Minor Gore	23	21	2	Male	White	Georgia	Electrocution	
60	June 3, 1927	Herbert Fennell	30	Unknown	Unknown	Male	Black	Georgia	Electrocution	
61	June 6, 1927	James Oscar Mars	45	43	2	Male	White	Georgia	Electrocution	
62	June 10, 1927	Pearl Mitchell	29	29	0	Male	Black	North Carolina	Electrocution	
63	June 10, 1927	John Hickman	30	29	1	Male	White	Ohio	Electrocution	
64	June 10, 1927	George Wargo	60	59	1	Male	White	Ohio	Electrocution	
65	June 10, 1927	John Butchek	47	45	2	Male	White	Oregon	Hanging	
66	June 17, 1927	Joe Chesnas	22	21	1	Male	White	Illinois	Hanging	
67	June 17, 1927	Leo Halterman	27	26	1	Male	White	Ohio	Electrocution	
68	June 24, 1927	Lonnie B. Dixon	18	17	1	Male	Black	Arkansas	Electrocution	
69	June 24, 1927	Elin Lyons	40	39	1	Male	Hispanic	Illinois	Hanging	
70	June 24, 1927	Frank Carter	46	45	1	Male	White	Nebraska	Electrocution	
71	July 7, 1927	Louis Frederick Boersig	44	44	0	Male	White	Virginia	Electrocution	
72	July 12, 1927	John Rounsaville	20	18	2	Male	Black	Georgia	Electrocution	
73	July 14, 1927	William Wagner	24	23	1	Male	White	New York	Electrocution	
74	July 15, 1927	Clyde Reese Bachelor	26	25	1	Male	White	Alabama	Electrocution	
75	July 15, 1927	Cellus Stewart	33	31	2	Male	Black	Georgia	Electrocution	
76	July 15, 1927	Charles Henry Duchowski	35	34	1	Male	White	Illinois	Hanging	
77	July 15, 1927	Walter Stalesky	38	37	1	Male	White	Illinois	Hanging	
78	July 15, 1927	Ricardo Torrez	27	26	1	Male	Hispanic	Illinois	Hanging	
79	July 18, 1927	Philip Orleck	20	19	1	Male	White	Ohio	Electrocution	
80	July 21, 1927	Peter J. Heslin	28	27	1	Male	White	New York	Electrocution	
81	July 22, 1927	Walter Burley	Unknown	Unknown	0	Male	Black	Mississippi	Hanging	
82	July 29, 1927	Roosevelt Hicks	25	23	2	Male	Black	Indiana	Electrocution	
83	August 5, 1927	Salvatore Merra	49	48	1	Male	White	New Jersey	Electrocution	
84	August 12, 1927	Pilipi Austero	38	Unknown	Unknown	Male	Asian	Hawaii Territory	Hanging	
85	August 12, 1927	Santiago Lacambra	26	Unknown	Unknown	Male	Asian	Hawaii Territory	Hanging	
86	August 12, 1927	McKinley Thomason	18	Unknown	Unknown	Male	Black	South Carolina	Electrocution	
87	August 12, 1927	Francis Marion Snow	46	44	2	Male	White	Texas	Electrocution	
88	August 22, 1927	Ed Joshlin	19	Unknown	Unknown	Male	Black	Texas	Electrocution	
89	August 23, 1927	Celestino F. Medeiros	25	18	7	Male	White	Massachusetts	Electrocution	
90	August 23, 1927	Nicola Sacco	36	28	8	Male	White	Massachusetts	Electrocution	
91	August 23, 1927	Bartolomeo Vanzetti	39	31	8	Male	White	Massachusetts	Electrocution	
92	September 2, 1927	Horace Cathey	20	Unknown	Unknown	Male	Black	Arkansas	Electrocution	
93	September 2, 1927	Booker T. Martin	25	Unknown	Unknown	Male	Black	Arkansas	Electrocution	
94	September 9, 1927	Sam Hall	Unknown	Unknown	1	Male	Black	Alabama	Electrocution	
95	September 9, 1927	William Henry Ross	23	23	0	Male	Black	Maryland	Hanging	
96	September 9, 1927	Ottie Simmons	19	19	0	Male	Black	Maryland	Hanging	
97	September 9, 1927	Arthur Swann	20	20	0	Male	Black	Maryland	Hanging	
98	September 16, 1927	Raymond C. Davis	28	26	2	Male	White	Kentucky	Electrocution	
99	September 23, 1927	Earl Jack Clark	37	35	2	Male	White	California	Hanging	
100	September 23, 1927	George Frank Bazemore	26	25	1	Male	Black	North Carolina	Electrocution	
101	September 23, 1927	Willie Robinson	23	Unknown	Unknown	Male	Black	Texas	Electrocution	
102	September 26, 1927	Carl Nolly	30	28	2	Male	Black	Pennsylvania	Electrocution	
103	September 26, 1927	Tillman Simmons	50	47	3	Male	Black	Texas	Electrocution	
104	September 29, 1927	Charles P. Albrecht	33	32	1	Male	White	New York	Electrocution	
105	October 7, 1927	Milan Vukich	37	35	2	Male	White	California	Hanging	
106	October 14, 1927	Lee Chamblee	40	Unknown	Unknown	Male	Black	Georgia	Electrocution	
107	October 14, 1927	Wilbur Galloway	28	Unknown	Unknown	Male	Black	Georgia	Electrocution	
108	October 14, 1927	Mose Parker	49	48	1	Male	Black	Georgia	Electrocution	
109	October 21, 1927	Charles Sieber	38	37	1	Male	White	California	Hanging	
110	October 21, 1927	Rado Millich	42	41	1	Male	White	Illinois	Hanging	
111	October 26, 1927	Roy Pryor	24	24	0	Male	Black	Georgia	Electrocution	
112	November 5, 1927	Avery V. Millikin	37	36	1	Male	White	Texas	Electrocution	
113	November 8, 1927	Chin Lung	33	33	0	Male	Asian	Connecticut	Hanging	
114	November 8, 1927	Soo Hoo Wing	19	19	0	Male	Asian	Connecticut	Hanging	
115	November 10, 1927	Herman E. Coggin	28	27	1	Male	White	Tennessee	Electrocution	
116	November 11, 1927	George Clark	26	Unknown	Unknown	Male	Black	Georgia	Electrocution	
117	November 11, 1927	Alfred Simms	19	19	0	Male	Black	Maryland	Hanging	
118	November 18, 1927	John Sanders	41	Unknown	Unknown	Male	Black	Georgia	Electrocution	
119	November 18, 1927	Christopher Barone	22	21	1	Male	White	New Jersey	Electrocution	
120	November 18, 1927	Louis Capozzi	27	26	1	Male	White	New Jersey	Electrocution	
121	November 18, 1927	Joseph Juliano	37	36	1	Male	White	New Jersey	Electrocution	
122	November 18, 1927	Giuseppe Juliano	31	30	1	Male	White	New Jersey	Electrocution	
123	November 21, 1927	Jerry Weeks	31	31	0	Male	Black	Pennsylvania	Electrocution	
124	November 22, 1927	Benjamin Franklin Levins	38	37	1	Male	White	Florida	Electrocution	
125	November 25, 1927	Nathan Bard	42	40	2	Male	Black	Kentucky	Hanging	
126	November 25, 1927	Bunyan Fleming	32	31	1	Male	Black	Kentucky	Hanging	
127	November 25, 1927	William Nelson	25	Unknown	Unknown	Male	Black	Virginia	Electrocution	
128	November 29, 1927	Louis Curtis Thomas	Unknown	Unknown	1	Male	White	Florida	Electrocution	
129	December 9, 1927	Hector Graham	41	41	0	Male	Black	North Carolina	Electrocution	
130	December 13, 1927	Thomas Costello	31	30	1	Male	White	Florida	Electrocution	
131	December 16, 1927	Jeff Coleman	Unknown	Unknown	0	Male	Black	Alabama	Electrocution	
132	December 16, 1927	William Brown	44	43	1	Male	Black	Illinois	Hanging	
133	December 16, 1927	James Hayes	29	29	0	Male	White	Illinois	Hanging	
134	December 16, 1927	George A. Ricci	33	33	0	Male	White	New York	Electrocution	
135	December 16, 1927	Peter A. Seiler	22	21	1	Male	White	New York	Electrocution	
136	December 21, 1927	William B. Henderson	30	29	1	Male	White	Florida	Electrocution	
137	December 23, 1927	Herschel Andrews	35	34	1	Male	White	Illinois	Hanging	
138	December 30, 1927	Bob Eatmon	21	21	0	Male	Black	Alabama	Electrocution	
139	December 30, 1927	Hugh Phillips	55	54	1	Male	White	Louisiana	Hanging	

== Demographics ==
Gender
Male	139	100%
Female	0	0%
Ethnicity
White	70	50%
Black	61	44%
Asian	6	4%
Hispanic	2	1%
State
New York	14	10%
Illinois	13	9%
Georgia	11	8%
Florida	9	6%
Ohio	8	6%
Pennsylvania	8	6%
Texas	8	6%
California	7	5%
New Jersey	7	5%
Alabama	6	4%
Massachusetts	6	4%
North Carolina	5	4%
Virginia	5	4%
Hawaii Territory	4	3%
Maryland	4	3%
Arkansas	3	2%
Kentucky	3	2%
Tennessee	3	2%
Connecticut	2	1%
Nebraska	2	1%
Oregon	2	1%
Arizona	1	1%
Delaware	1	1%
Indiana	1	1%
Louisiana	1	1%
Mississippi	1	1%
Montana	1	1%
South Carolina	1	1%
Washington	1	1%
West Virginia	1	1%
Method
Electrocution	98	71%
Hanging	41	29%
Month
January	14	10%
February	9	6%
March	12	9%
April	12	9%
May	11	8%
June	12	9%
July	12	9%
August	9	6%
September	13	9%
October	7	5%
November	17	12%
December	11	8%
Age
Unknown	7	5%
10–19	8	6%
20–29	63	45%
30–39	38	27%
40–49	18	13%
50–59	4	3%
60–69	1	1%
Total	139	100%

== Executions in recent years ==
Number of executions
1928	145
1927	139
1926	141
Total	425

Preceded by 1926	List of people executed in the United States in 1927	Succeeded by 1928
