= List of people executed in the United States in 1926 =

One hundred and forty-one people, all male, were executed in the United States in 1926, eighty-seven by electrocution, fifty-one by hanging, two by firing squad, and one by gas chamber.

== List of people executed in the United States in 1926 ==
| No. | Date of execution | Name | Age of person | | | Gender | Ethnicity | State | Method | Ref. |
| No. | Date of execution | Name | At execution | At offense | Age difference | Gender | Ethnicity | State | Method | Ref. |
|---|---|---|---|---|---|---|---|---|---|---|
| 1 | January 1, 1926 | Melton Carr | 23 | 22 | 1 | Male | Black | Texas | Electrocution | |
| 2 | January 8, 1926 | Tyrus Clark | 28 | 28 | 0 | Male | White | Arkansas | Electrocution | |
| 3 | January 8, 1926 | Aaron Harris | Unknown | Unknown | 1 | Male | Black | Arkansas | Electrocution | |
| 4 | January 8, 1926 | William Andrew Lawrence | 26 | 26 | 0 | Male | White | Arizona | Hanging | |
| 5 | January 8, 1926 | John Wesley Dawkins | 20 | Unknown | Unknown | Male | Black | North Carolina | Electrocution | |
| 6 | January 9, 1926 | James Henry | 37 | 37 | 0 | Male | Black | Ohio | Electrocution | |
| 7 | January 9, 1926 | Agapito Rueda | 29 | 27 | 2 | Male | Hispanic | Texas | Electrocution | |
| 8 | January 15, 1926 | Ralph W. Seybolt | 25 | 25 | 0 | Male | White | Utah | Firing squad | |
| 9 | January 16, 1926 | Edward Stewart | 25 | 24 | 1 | Male | Black | Indiana | Electrocution | |
| 10 | January 22, 1926 | Murray Rankin | Unknown | Unknown | Unknown | Male | Black | Alabama | Hanging | |
| 11 | January 22, 1926 | Peter Jankowski | 27 | 26 | 1 | Male | White | Indiana | Electrocution | |
| 12 | January 22, 1926 | Arthur Montague | 22 | 21 | 1 | Male | Black | North Carolina | Electrocution | |
| 13 | January 22, 1926 | William Spencer | 28 | 27 | 1 | Male | Black | Virginia | Electrocution | |
| 14 | January 25, 1926 | Robert Brue | 45 | 43 | 2 | Male | Black | Pennsylvania | Electrocution | |
| 15 | January 25, 1926 | Leamon Crocker | 24 | 22 | 2 | Male | Black | Pennsylvania | Electrocution | |
| 16 | January 25, 1926 | Irvin P. Grinage | 31 | 29 | 2 | Male | Black | Pennsylvania | Electrocution | |
| 17 | January 28, 1926 | Will Champion | Unknown | Unknown | Unknown | Male | Black | Florida | Electrocution | |
| 18 | January 28, 1926 | Luigi Rapito | 34 | Unknown | Unknown | Male | White | New York | Electrocution | |
| 19 | January 28, 1926 | Emil Klatt | 35 | 25 | 10 | Male | White | New York | Electrocution | |
| 20 | January 29, 1926 | Gervis Lee Bloodworth | 24 | 22 | 2 | Male | White | Georgia | Hanging | |
| 21 | January 29, 1926 | Willie Jones | 20 | 17 | 3 | Male | White | Georgia | Hanging | |
| 22 | January 29, 1926 | Campbell McCarthy | 19 | Unknown | Unknown | Male | Black | Illinois | Hanging | |
| 23 | January 29, 1926 | Howard G. Roberson | 33 | 32 | 1 | Male | White | Louisiana | Hanging | |
| 24 | January 29, 1926 | Robert Ford | 25 | 24 | 1 | Male | Black | West Virginia | Hanging | |
| 25 | February 4, 1926 | Matthew Wasser | 37 | Unknown | Unknown | Male | White | New York | Electrocution | |
| 26 | February 4, 1926 | Ernest T. Mimms | 29 | 28 | 1 | Male | Black | New York | Electrocution | |
| 27 | February 5, 1926 | Roy Edmons | 22 | 22 | 0 | Male | Black | Arkansas | Electrocution | |
| 28 | February 5, 1926 | Lee Walker | 23 | 23 | 0 | Male | Black | Arkansas | Electrocution | |
| 29 | February 5, 1926 | Edward McGowan | 51 | 49 | 2 | Male | Black | Utah | Firing squad | |
| 30 | February 12, 1926 | Ishman Jones | 23 | 22 | 1 | Male | Black | Arkansas | Electrocution | |
| 31 | February 12, 1926 | Cephus Johnson | 26 | 25 | 1 | Male | Black | Arkansas | Electrocution | |
| 32 | February 12, 1926 | Clinton Mason | 26 | 25 | 1 | Male | Black | Arkansas | Electrocution | |
| 33 | February 12, 1926 | John Canady | 30 | 29 | 1 | Male | Black | Arkansas | Electrocution | |
| 34 | February 13, 1926 | Harry Garbutt | 44 | 42 | 2 | Male | White | California | Hanging | |
| 35 | February 13, 1926 | Alva C. Grimmett | 42 | 41 | 1 | Male | White | Illinois | Hanging | |
| 36 | February 13, 1926 | Joseph W. Holmes | 25 | 25 | 0 | Male | White | Illinois | Hanging | |
| 37 | February 13, 1926 | Jack Woods | Unknown | Unknown | 1 | Male | White | Illinois | Hanging | |
| 38 | February 19, 1926 | Rudolph Ernest Disse | 20 | 20 | 0 | Male | White | Virginia | Electrocution | |
| 39 | February 19, 1926 | Lee E. Mosley | 45 | 43 | 2 | Male | Black | Washington | Hanging | |
| 40 | February 26, 1926 | Harry Butler | 21 | Unknown | Unknown | Male | Black | Delaware | Hanging | |
| 41 | March 1, 1926 | Thomas Legins | 28 | 26 | 2 | Male | Black | Pennsylvania | Electrocution | |
| 42 | March 5, 1926 | Herbert Julius | 28 | 26 | 2 | Male | Black | Alabama | Hanging | |
| 43 | March 5, 1926 | Ed Harris | 42 | 42 | 0 | Male | Black | Kentucky | Hanging | |
| 44 | March 11, 1926 | Charlie Walton | 39 | 38 | 1 | Male | Black | Georgia | Electrocution | |
| 45 | March 12, 1926 | Willie Vaughn | 22 | 20 | 2 | Male | Black | Texas | Electrocution | |
| 46 | March 19, 1926 | Louis Watkins | 28 | 27 | 1 | Male | Black | Virginia | Electrocution | |
| 47 | March 25, 1926 | Theodore L. Coggeshall | 21 | 20 | 1 | Male | White | Georgia | Electrocution | |
| 48 | March 25, 1926 | Floyd McClelland | 20 | 19 | | Male | White | Georgia | Electrocution | |
| 49 | March 26, 1926 | Henry Smith | 26 | Unknown | Unknown | Male | Black | Indiana | Electrocution | |
| 50 | March 26, 1926 | Patrick Donahue | 37 | 36 | 1 | Male | White | Mississippi | Hanging | |
| 51 | March 29, 1926 | George H. Prescott | Unknown | Unknown | 2 | Male | White | Pennsylvania | Electrocution | |
| 52 | April 6, 1926 | Gerald Chapman | 38 | 37 | 1 | Male | White | Connecticut | Hanging | |
| 53 | April 6, 1926 | Forest Robinson | 26 | 26 | 0 | Male | Black | Texas | Electrocution | |
| 54 | April 6, 1926 | S.A. Robinson | 28 | 28 | 0 | Male | Black | Texas | Electrocution | |
| 55 | April 16, 1926 | Raymond Costello | 22 | 22 | 0 | Male | White | Illinois | Hanging | |
| 56 | April 16, 1926 | Emil F. Fricker | 45 | 39 | 6 | Male | White | Illinois | Hanging | |
| 57 | April 16, 1926 | Charles Hobbs | Unknown | Unknown | Unknown | Male | Black | Illinois | Hanging | |
| 58 | April 16, 1926 | Jose Ortiz | 19 | 18 | 1 | Male | Hispanic | Illinois | Hanging | |
| 59 | April 16, 1926 | Aubry Brown | Unknown | Unknown | 1 | Male | Black | Mississippi | Hanging | |
| 60 | April 16, 1926 | Archie Binard Cody | 33 | 31 | 2 | Male | White | Oregon | Hanging | |
| 61 | April 16, 1926 | John Smith | 24 | 23 | 1 | Male | Black | Texas | Electrocution | |
| 62 | April 19, 1926 | Harry Sawyer | 24 | 24 | 0 | Male | Black | West Virginia | Hanging | |
| 63 | April 23, 1926 | William Brodes | 38 | Unknown | Unknown | Male | Black | Louisiana | Hanging | |
| 64 | May 3, 1926 | T. Harris | 32 | 30 | 2 | Male | Black | Texas | Electrocution | |
| 65 | May 5, 1926 | Richard J. Stewart | 32 | 31 | 1 | Male | Black | Massachusetts | Electrocution | |
| 66 | May 7, 1926 | Robert S. Milton | 27 | 26 | 1 | Male | Black | Mississippi | Hanging | |
| 67 | May 12, 1926 | Roy Dunwood | Unknown | Unknown | 1 | Male | Black | Florida | Electrocution | |
| 68 | May 14, 1926 | Sam Phillips | 31 | 29 | 2 | Male | Black | Texas | Electrocution | |
| 69 | May 18, 1926 | John Simmons | Unknown | Unknown | 1 | Male | Black | Florida | Electrocution | |
| 70 | May 18, 1926 | Mack Wooten | 52 | 48 | 4 | Male | Black | Georgia | Hanging | |
| 71 | May 21, 1926 | Stanko Jukich | 29 | 28 | 1 | Male | White | Nevada | Gas chamber | |
| 72 | May 24, 1926 | Milo Dwight Dorst | 27 | 26 | 1 | Male | White | Pennsylvania | Electrocution | |
| 73 | May 25, 1926 | Harry Scrimm | 48 | 47 | 1 | Male | White | Florida | Electrocution | |
| 74 | May 28, 1926 | Elisha Sloan | 30 | 29 | 1 | Male | White | Kentucky | Electrocution | |
| 75 | May 28, 1926 | Edward Ricker Lake | 31 | Unknown | Unknown | Male | White | Kentucky | Electrocution | |
| 76 | May 28, 1926 | John Baker | 34 | 33 | 1 | Male | Black | Kentucky | Electrocution | |
| 77 | June 1, 1926 | Charles Steele | 26 | 25 | 1 | Male | White | Pennsylvania | Electrocution | |
| 78 | June 9, 1926 | Albert Jones | 37 | Unknown | Unknown | Male | Black | Arkansas | Electrocution | |
| 79 | June 9, 1926 | Willie Martin | 36 | 35 | 1 | Male | Black | Arkansas | Electrocution | |
| 80 | June 11, 1926 | Fred Jones | 24 | Unknown | Unknown | Male | Black | North Carolina | Electrocution | |
| 81 | June 18, 1926 | Amos Stewart | 28 | 28 | 0 | Male | Black | Georgia | Electrocution | |
| 82 | June 24, 1926 | Frank A. Daly | 22 | 21 | 1 | Male | White | New York | Electrocution | |
| 83 | June 25, 1926 | Campbell L. Starks | 30 | 30 | 0 | Male | Black | Alabama | Hanging | |
| 84 | June 25, 1926 | Felix Sloper | 29 | 28 | 1 | Male | White | California | Hanging | |
| 85 | June 25, 1926 | Frank Liska | 42 | 41 | 1 | Male | White | Ohio | Electrocution | |
| 86 | June 28, 1926 | Angelo Cicere | 34 | 30 | 4 | Male | White | Pennsylvania | Electrocution | |
| 87 | July 8, 1926 | William R. Clark | 19 | 19 | 0 | Male | White | Ohio | Electrocution | |
| 88 | July 9, 1926 | John Jurko | 41 | 39 | 2 | Male | White | Idaho | Hanging | |
| 89 | July 9, 1926 | Fred G. Tilford | 24 | 24 | 0 | Male | Black | Texas | Electrocution | |
| 90 | July 12, 1926 | John Musztuk | 35 | Unknown | Unknown | Male | White | Pennsylvania | Electrocution | |
| 91 | July 15, 1926 | Sam Wing | 27 | 26 | 1 | Male | Asian | New York | Electrocution | |
| 92 | July 16, 1926 | R.B. Henderson | 21 | Unknown | Unknown | Male | Black | Louisiana | Hanging | |
| 93 | July 16, 1926 | Jefferson Davis Wallace | 65 | 64 | 1 | Male | White | Mississippi | Hanging | |
| 94 | July 23, 1926 | Isaac J. Benson | 37 | 37 | 0 | Male | Black | Maryland | Hanging | |
| 95 | August 6, 1926 | Willie Johnson | Unknown | Unknown | Unknown | Male | Black | Louisiana | Hanging | |
| 96 | August 13, 1926 | Richard Reese Whittemore | 24 | 23 | 1 | Male | White | Maryland | Hanging | |
| 97 | August 19, 1926 | David DeMaio | 33 | 32 | 1 | Male | White | New York | Electrocution | |
| 98 | August 19, 1926 | William Hoyer | 26 | Unknown | Unknown | Male | Black | New York | Electrocution | |
| 99 | August 20, 1926 | Charles Barr | 23 | 20 | 3 | Male | Black | Tennessee | Electrocution | |
| 100 | August 20, 1926 | Philip Euman | 18 | 18 | 0 | Male | Black | West Virginia | Hanging | |
| 101 | August 26, 1926 | Cosimo Brescia | 19 | 18 | 1 | Male | White | New York | Electrocution | |
| 102 | August 26, 1926 | John Garguila | 19 | 18 | 1 | Male | White | New York | Electrocution | |
| 103 | August 27, 1926 | Charles Peevia | 53 | 53 | 0 | Male | Black | California | Hanging | |
| 104 | August 27, 1926 | Sylvester Mackey | 22 | 22 | 0 | Male | Black | Mississippi | Hanging | |
| 105 | August 27, 1926 | John Cooper | 43 | 43 | 0 | Male | Black | South Carolina | Electrocution | |
| 106 | August 27, 1926 | James Patterson | 37 | Unknown | Unknown | Male | Black | Virginia | Electrocution | |
| 107 | September 2, 1926 | John Bryant | 40 | 40 | 0 | Male | Black | Ohio | Electrocution | |
| 108 | September 2, 1926 | Richard Rhodes | 29 | 29 | 0 | Male | White | Ohio | Electrocution | |
| 109 | September 2, 1926 | John Hedrick | 30 | 29 | 1 | Male | White | Ohio | Electrocution | |
| 110 | September 9, 1926 | Ed Glover | Unknown | Unknown | 0 | Male | Black | Georgia | Electrocution | |
| 111 | September 10, 1926 | Isaac Wolfgang | 57 | 53 | 4 | Male | White | California | Hanging | |
| 112 | September 10, 1926 | Henry Jackson | 44 | 44 | 0 | Male | Black | West Virginia | Hanging | |
| 113 | September 18, 1926 | Ray F. Shank | 51 | 50 | 1 | Male | White | Colorado | Hanging | |
| 114 | September 21, 1926 | John Williams | 30 | Unknown | Unknown | Male | Black | North Carolina | Electrocution | |
| 115 | September 24, 1926 | Frank Owens | Unknown | Unknown | 2 | Male | Black | Alabama | Hanging | |
| 116 | September 24, 1926 | Tom Johnson | 48 | 48 | 0 | Male | Black | Georgia | Electrocution | |
| 117 | September 24, 1926 | James Satchell | 25 | Unknown | Unknown | Male | Black | Virginia | Electrocution | |
| 118 | October 1, 1926 | Tony Vettere | 47 | 46 | 1 | Male | White | Montana | Hanging | |
| 119 | October 8, 1926 | Willie Adams | 23 | 22 | 1 | Male | Hispanic | California | Hanging | |
| 120 | October 8, 1926 | Alfonse Rincon | 24 | 23 | 1 | Male | Hispanic | California | Hanging | |
| 121 | October 8, 1926 | Pringle Williams | 17 | Unknown | Unknown | Male | Black | Georgia | Electrocution | |
| 122 | October 15, 1926 | Mauricio Trinidad | 33 | 32 | 1 | Male | Hispanic | California | Hanging | |
| 123 | October 15, 1926 | Joseph Howard Watts | 32 | 30 | 2 | Male | White | California | Hanging | |
| 124 | October 28, 1926 | Phillip Taylor | Unknown | Unknown | Unknown | Male | Black | Florida | Electrocution | |
| 125 | October 29, 1926 | Richard B. Evans | 20 | 19 | 1 | Male | White | Illinois | Hanging | |
| 126 | November 12, 1926 | Antonio Casias | 42 | 42 | 0 | Male | Hispanic | Colorado | Hanging | |
| 127 | November 13, 1926 | James Johnson | Unknown | Unknown | 0 | Male | Black | Georgia | Electrocution | |
| 128 | November 23, 1926 | Willie Green | Unknown | Unknown | 1 | Male | Black | Florida | Electrocution | |
| 129 | November 26, 1926 | Emanuel Ross | 18 | 17 | 1 | Male | Black | Ohio | Electrocution | |
| 130 | November 30, 1926 | James Lynch | 28 | 27 | 1 | Male | White | New Jersey | Electrocution | |
| 131 | December 2, 1926 | John Joseph Brennan | 29 | 28 | 1 | Male | White | New York | Electrocution | |
| 132 | December 9, 1926 | Casimir Barszyouk | 21 | 21 | 0 | Male | White | New York | Electrocution | |
| 133 | December 9, 1926 | William Barszyouk | 28 | 28 | 0 | Male | White | New York | Electrocution | |
| 134 | December 9, 1926 | John Maxwell | 21 | 21 | 0 | Male | White | New York | Electrocution | |
| 135 | December 11, 1926 | Arthur Williams | 36 | 35 | 1 | Male | Black | Florida | Electrocution | |
| 136 | December 17, 1926 | Roger J. Brannon | 21 | 20 | 1 | Male | White | Kentucky | Electrocution | |
| 137 | December 17, 1926 | Sam Harris | 36 | 35 | 1 | Male | Black | Kentucky | Electrocution | |
| 138 | December 27, 1926 | Paul Fasci | 25 | 22 | 3 | Male | White | Pennsylvania | Electrocution | |
| 139 | December 27, 1926 | Paul Orlakowski | 28 | 26 | 2 | Male | White | Pennsylvania | Electrocution | |
| 140 | December 31, 1926 | James Gricius | 22 | 22 | 0 | Male | White | Illinois | Hanging | |
| 141 | December 31, 1926 | Thomas James McWane | 20 | 19 | 1 | Male | White | Illinois | Hanging | |

== Demographics ==
Gender
| Male | 141 | 100% |
| Female | 0 | 0% |
Ethnicity
| Black | 76 | 54% |
| White | 58 | 41% |
| Hispanic | 6 | 4% |
| Asian | 1 | 1% |
State
| New York | 14 | 10% |
| Georgia | 11 | 8% |
| Illinois | 11 | 8% |
| Pennsylvania | 11 | 8% |
| Arkansas | 10 | 7% |
| Texas | 9 | 6% |
| California | 8 | 6% |
| Florida | 7 | 5% |
| Ohio | 7 | 5% |
| Kentucky | 6 | 4% |
| Mississippi | 5 | 4% |
| Virginia | 5 | 4% |
| Alabama | 4 | 3% |
| Louisiana | 4 | 3% |
| North Carolina | 4 | 3% |
| West Virginia | 4 | 3% |
| Indiana | 3 | 2% |
| Colorado | 2 | 1% |
| Maryland | 2 | 1% |
| Utah | 2 | 1% |
| Arizona | 1 | 1% |
| Connecticut | 1 | 1% |
| Delaware | 1 | 1% |
| Idaho | 1 | 1% |
| Massachusetts | 1 | 1% |
| Montana | 1 | 1% |
| Nevada | 1 | 1% |
| New Jersey | 1 | 1% |
| Oregon | 1 | 1% |
| South Carolina | 1 | 1% |
| Tennessee | 1 | 1% |
| Washington | 1 | 1% |
Method
| Electrocution | 87 | 62% |
| Hanging | 51 | 36% |
| Firing squad | 2 | 1% |
| Gas chamber | 1 | 1% |
Month
| January | 24 | 17% |
| February | 16 | 11% |
| March | 11 | 8% |
| April | 12 | 9% |
| May | 13 | 9% |
| June | 10 | 7% |
| July | 8 | 6% |
| August | 12 | 9% |
| September | 11 | 8% |
| October | 8 | 6% |
| November | 5 | 4% |
| December | 11 | 8% |
Age
| Unknown | 15 | 11% |
| 10–19 | 8 | 6% |
| 20–29 | 65 | 46% |
| 30–39 | 32 | 23% |
| 40–49 | 15 | 11% |
| 50–59 | 5 | 4% |
| 60–69 | 1 | 1% |
| Total | 141 | 100% |

== Executions in recent years ==
Number of executions
| 1927 | 139 |
| 1926 | 141 |
| 1925 | 144 |
| Total | 424 |

| Preceded by 1925 | List of people executed in the United States in 1926 | Succeeded by 1927 |
