= List of people executed in the United States in 1922 =

One hundred and forty-eight people, one hundred and forty-seven male and one female, were executed in the United States in 1922, ninety-five by electrocution, fifty-one by hanging, and two by firing squad.

== List of people executed in the United States in 1922 ==
No.	Date of execution	Name	Age of person			Gender	Ethnicity	State	Method	Ref.
No.	Date of execution	Name	At execution	At offense	Age difference	Gender	Ethnicity	State	Method	Ref.
1	January 3, 1922	Chung Tao	Unknown	Unknown	Unknown	Male	Asian	Pennsylvania	Electrocution	
2	January 12, 1922	William J. Marweg	40	37	3	Male	White	New York	Electrocution	
3	January 12, 1922	Raymond F. Mulford	29	28	1	Male	White	New York	Electrocution	
4	January 12, 1922	Edward Walter Persons	40	38	2	Male	White	New York	Electrocution	
5	January 13, 1922	Ricardo Lauterio	23	21	2	Male	Hispanic	Arizona	Hanging	
6	January 13, 1922	Tomas Roman	32	31	1	Male	Hispanic	Arizona	Hanging	
7	January 13, 1922	Pattie Perdue	Unknown	Unknown	Unknown	Female	Black	Mississippi	Hanging	
8	January 13, 1922	Leon Viverett	Unknown	Unknown	Unknown	Male	Black	Mississippi	Hanging	
9	January 17, 1922	George Washington Knight	23	22	1	Male	Black	New Jersey	Electrocution	
10	January 17, 1922	Louis Lively	35	35	0	Male	Black	New Jersey	Electrocution	
11	January 20, 1922	Eleuterio Corral	18	17	1	Male	Hispanic	New Mexico	Hanging	
12	January 20, 1922	Rumaldo Losano	19	18	1	Male	Hispanic	New Mexico	Hanging	
13	January 20, 1922	Steve Maslich	36	34	2	Male	White	Utah	Firing squad	
14	January 23, 1922	Walter A. Lewis	21	19	2	Male	Black	Pennsylvania	Electrocution	
15	January 23, 1922	John Mason	39	Unknown	Unknown	Male	Black	Pennsylvania	Electrocution	
16	January 23, 1922	Harry Hart	23	22	1	Male	Black	Virginia	Electrocution	
17	February 2, 1922	Harry Givner	27	Unknown	Unknown	Male	White	New York	Electrocution	
18	February 2, 1922	Floyd Slover	21	19	2	Male	White	New York	Electrocution	
19	February 3, 1922	Curtis Franklin	33	32	1	Male	Black	South Carolina	Electrocution	
20	February 7, 1922	George E. Gares	55	55	0	Male	White	New Jersey	Electrocution	
21	February 7, 1922	Edmond Thompson	23	21	2	Male	Black	Virginia	Electrocution	
22	February 17, 1922	Gjuro "Joe" Vuckovich	34	33	1	Male	White	Montana	Hanging	
23	February 17, 1922	John Green	28	27	1	Male	White	Tennessee	Electrocution	
24	February 18, 1922	Asbury Fields	47	46	1	Male	White	Tennessee	Electrocution	
25	February 23, 1922	Henry Lockett	34	33	1	Male	Black	Virginia	Electrocution	
26	February 24, 1922	Luis Guillen	21	20	1	Male	Hispanic	California	Hanging	
27	February 24, 1922	John Bowyer	23	22	1	Male	Black	Florida	Hanging	
28	February 24, 1922	Samuel C. Smith	26	25	1	Male	Black	Maryland	Hanging	
29	February 24, 1922	Arthur Harding	38	37	1	Male	Black	Ohio	Electrocution	
30	February 24, 1922	Thomas Sparks	26	25	1	Male	Black	Virginia	Electrocution	
31	February 27, 1922	Michael Marano	31	29	2	Male	White	Pennsylvania	Electrocution	
32	March 1, 1922	Harry Lee Bland	27	27	0	Male	White	Ohio	Electrocution	
33	March 1, 1922	Walter Wallace Wright	28	28	0	Male	White	Ohio	Electrocution	
34	March 1, 1922	Charles Petree	21	20	1	Male	White	Tennessee	Electrocution	
35	March 1, 1922	Thomas Peril Christmas	26	25	1	Male	White	Tennessee	Electrocution	
36	March 1, 1922	Otto Stevens	29	28	1	Male	White	Tennessee	Electrocution	
37	March 1, 1922	John B. McClure	26	26	0	Male	White	Tennessee	Electrocution	
38	March 2, 1922	Harvey William Church	23	22	1	Male	White	Illinois	Hanging	
39	March 2, 1922	George F. McCormick	22	21	1	Male	White	New York	Electrocution	
40	March 3, 1922	John A. McGuire	23	22	1	Male	White	Ohio	Electrocution	
41	March 3, 1922	Leroy Tyler	34	32	2	Male	Black	Ohio	Electrocution	
42	March 3, 1922	Leroy Williams	25	24	1	Male	Black	West Virginia	Hanging	
43	March 10, 1922	James Wells	18	17	1	Male	Black	Arkansas	Electrocution	
44	March 15, 1922	Maurice Mays	31	29	2	Male	Black	Tennessee	Electrocution	
45	March 17, 1922	John McHenry	24	21	3	Male	White	District of Columbia	Hanging	
46	March 17, 1922	Steve Sabo	49	49	0	Male	White	Oklahoma	Electrocution	
47	March 20, 1922	Albert Torrence White	56	54	2	Male	White	Pennsylvania	Electrocution	
48	March 23, 1922	Lawrence J. Kubal	37	36	1	Male	White	New York	Electrocution	
49	March 25, 1922	Roy Charles Chamblin	27	26	1	Male	White	Ohio	Electrocution	
50	March 27, 1922	Bernard Sherdon McAneny	38	37	1	Male	White	Pennsylvania	Electrocution	
51	March 27, 1922	John Shurilla	24	Unknown	Unknown	Male	White	Pennsylvania	Electrocution	
52	March 31, 1922	Will Elmore	29	Unknown	Unknown	Male	Black	Virginia	Electrocution	
53	April 3, 1922	Archie Adolph Patterson	34	33	1	Male	Black	Pennsylvania	Electrocution	
54	April 4, 1922	Henry Barnes	32	Unknown	Unknown	Male	Black	Virginia	Electrocution	
55	April 7, 1922	Will Hood	19	18	1	Male	Black	South Carolina	Electrocution	
56	April 11, 1922	Granville Bunch	39	38	1	Male	White	Tennessee	Electrocution	
57	April 14, 1922	George F. Hornsby	30	29	1	Male	White	Texas	Hanging	
58	April 16, 1922	Marshall Tillman	25	23	2	Male	Black	Pennsylvania	Electrocution	
59	April 20, 1922	Bill Byrd	Unknown	Unknown	Unknown	Male	Black	Louisiana	Hanging	
60	April 20, 1922	Lawrence Torrence	29	28	1	Male	Black	New York	Electrocution	
61	May 4, 1922	Monroe S. Payton	Unknown	Unknown	Unknown	Male	Black	West Virginia	Hanging	
62	May 5, 1922	William Ravenal	51	50	1	Male	Black	Georgia	Hanging	
63	May 5, 1922	George Bush	38	Unknown	Unknown	Male	Black	Ohio	Electrocution	
64	May 5, 1922	John Vaiden	26	25	1	Male	Black	Ohio	Electrocution	
65	May 5, 1922	Sam Watkins	39	39	0	Male	White	Oklahoma	Electrocution	
66	May 9, 1922	Samuel Purpera	18	16	2	Male	White	Ohio	Electrocution	
67	May 12, 1922	Henry Langston Jr.	Unknown	Unknown	Unknown	Male	Black	Georgia	Hanging	
68	May 15, 1922	Earl Carter	22	20	2	Male	Black	Pennsylvania	Electrocution	
69	May 22, 1922	George Steward	27	27	0	Male	Black	Pennsylvania	Electrocution	
70	May 26, 1922	John Valcalda	40	39	1	Male	Hispanic	California	Hanging	
71	May 26, 1922	Ernest Fern Brown	20	19	1	Male	Black	Virginia	Electrocution	
72	May 31, 1922	William Morehouse	57	55	2	Male	White	New Jersey	Electrocution	
73	June 1, 1922	William P. Donovan	35	34	1	Male	White	Indiana	Electrocution	
74	June 8, 1922	Luigi Ebanisto	23	22	1	Male	White	New York	Electrocution	
75	June 8, 1922	Albert Librero	24	23	1	Male	White	New York	Electrocution	
76	June 8, 1922	Julius Rosenwasser	26	Unknown	Unknown	Male	White	New York	Electrocution	
77	June 9, 1922	James B. King	33	32	1	Male	Black	Nebraska	Electrocution	
78	June 9, 1922	Nick John Oblizalo	23	19	4	Male	White	Utah	Firing squad	
79	June 14, 1922	Dominic Benigno	24	23	1	Male	White	Ohio	Electrocution	
80	June 15, 1922	William Bell	27	26	1	Male	Black	New York	Electrocution	
81	June 16, 1922	Teague Cunningham	27	26	1	Male	Black	Alabama	Hanging	
82	June 16, 1922	Jim Denson	20	17	3	Male	Black	Georgia	Hanging	
83	June 16, 1922	Samuel Jones Kirby	36	35	1	Male	White	South Carolina	Electrocution	
84	June 16, 1922	Jesse James Gappins	23	22	1	Male	White	South Carolina	Electrocution	
85	June 16, 1922	Casy Otis Fox	32	31	1	Male	White	South Carolina	Electrocution	
86	June 19, 1922	Henry K. Lisowski	Unknown	Unknown	Unknown	Male	White	Pennsylvania	Electrocution	
87	June 20, 1922	John Henry Gackenbach	21	20	1	Male	White	Ohio	Electrocution	
88	June 23, 1922	George Howze	23	23	0	Male	Black	Alabama	Hanging	
89	June 23, 1922	Steve Myeskie	22	21	1	Male	White	Ohio	Electrocution	
90	June 26, 1922	James Di Stefano	Unknown	Unknown	Unknown	Male	White	Pennsylvania	Electrocution	
91	June 29, 1922	Michael Rossi	65	62	3	Male	White	New York	Electrocution	
92	July 7, 1922	Elvie Daniel Kirby	25	23	2	Male	White	Oregon	Hanging	
93	July 7, 1922	John L. Rathie	24	22	2	Male	White	Oregon	Hanging	
94	July 14, 1922	Walter Delaney	Unknown	Unknown	3	Male	Black	Alabama	Hanging	
95	July 14, 1922	Forrest Scott	Unknown	Unknown	Unknown	Male	Black	Alabama	Hanging	
96	July 17, 1922	Jonas Ebersole	34	33	1	Male	White	Pennsylvania	Electrocution	
97	July 17, 1922	Joseph Dreher	30	Unknown	Unknown	Male	Black	Pennsylvania	Electrocution	
98	July 20, 1922	Peter Nunziato	19	18	1	Male	White	New York	Electrocution	
99	July 20, 1922	Saito Taizo	21	20	1	Male	Asian	New York	Electrocution	
100	July 24, 1922	John Gilbert McCloskey	23	22	1	Male	White	Pennsylvania	Electrocution	
101	July 25, 1922	William Dwight	18	17	1	Male	Black	Tennessee	Electrocution	
102	July 28, 1922	Luis Medrano	27	27	0	Male	Hispanic	New Mexico	Hanging	
103	July 28, 1922	Ysidoro Miranda	33	32	1	Male	Hispanic	New Mexico	Hanging	
104	July 28, 1922	Carlos Renteria	24	23	1	Male	Hispanic	New Mexico	Hanging	
105	July 31, 1922	Perley Johnson Emery	29	28	1	Male	White	Pennsylvania	Electrocution	
106	August 11, 1922	Shelby McLaurin	Unknown	Unknown	Unknown	Male	White	Mississippi	Hanging	
107	August 15, 1922	Austin Harris	Unknown	Unknown	Unknown	Male	Black	Tennessee	Electrocution	
108	August 15, 1922	James Garfield McElroy	38	37	1	Male	White	Tennessee	Electrocution	
109	August 18, 1922	Daniel Borich	51	51	0	Male	White	Colorado	Hanging	
110	August 31, 1922	Luther Boddy	22	22	0	Male	Black	New York	Electrocution	
111	August 31, 1922	Herbert Wents Smith	32	31	1	Male	White	New York	Electrocution	
112	September 1, 1922	Ephraim High	Unknown	Unknown	1	Male	Black	Alabama	Hanging	
113	September 1, 1922	Luke McDonald	Unknown	Unknown	Unknown	Male	Black	Georgia	Hanging	
114	September 1, 1922	Francis Brooks DuPre	19	18	1	Male	White	Georgia	Hanging	
115	September 5, 1922	Guilford C. Young	28	Unknown	Unknown	Male	White	New Jersey	Electrocution	
116	September 8, 1922	Ira Vernon Pavey	30	27	3	Male	White	Iowa	Hanging	
117	September 8, 1922	George Howard	25	23	2	Male	White	Oregon	Hanging	
118	September 15, 1922	Eugene Claude Weeks	27	26	1	Male	White	Iowa	Hanging	
119	September 15, 1922	Angus Murphy	36	36	0	Male	Black	North Carolina	Electrocution	
120	September 15, 1922	Joseph Thomas	20	20	0	Male	Black	North Carolina	Electrocution	
121	September 22, 1922	Marsis Sisneres	50	Unknown	Unknown	Male	Hispanic	California	Hanging	
122	September 22, 1922	Abraham H. Johnson	55	Unknown	Unknown	Male	White	Texas	Hanging	
123	September 25, 1922	Peter Erico	29	27	2	Male	White	Pennsylvania	Electrocution	
124	September 25, 1922	Antonio Puntario	35	33	2	Male	White	Pennsylvania	Electrocution	
125	September 29, 1922	Theodore West	35	34	1	Male	White	Arizona	Hanging	
126	October 2, 1922	Henry Andrew Blakeley	47	45	2	Male	White	Pennsylvania	Electrocution	
127	October 6, 1922	Miguel Manriquez	27	26	1	Male	Hispanic	California	Hanging	
128	October 12, 1922	McIver Burnett	17	17	0	Male	Black	North Carolina	Electrocution	
129	October 13, 1922	Robert Sewall	Unknown	Unknown	Unknown	Male	Black	Louisiana	Hanging	
130	October 13, 1922	Bosie Sims	Unknown	Unknown	Unknown	Male	Black	Louisiana	Hanging	
131	October 20, 1922	Stephen F. Katonka	34	33	1	Male	White	California	Hanging	
132	October 24, 1922	Emil Schutte	54	48	6	Male	White	Connecticut	Hanging	
133	October 30, 1922	James DiSalvo	41	Unknown	Unknown	Male	White	Pennsylvania	Electrocution	
134	October 30, 1922	Thomas Verne Ryhal	43	42	1	Male	White	Pennsylvania	Electrocution	
135	October 30, 1922	Curtis Caleb Sipple	21	18	3	Male	White	Pennsylvania	Electrocution	
136	November 3, 1922	Aaron Howard	19	Unknown	Unknown	Male	Black	Alabama	Hanging	
137	November 6, 1922	Frederick I. Kerr	27	24	3	Male	White	Pennsylvania	Electrocution	
138	November 10, 1922	William Alexander Stultz	46	43	3	Male	White	Maryland	Hanging	
139	November 16, 1922	Dave Brown	27	26	1	Male	White	Kentucky	Electrocution	
140	November 24, 1922	Lew Fat	28	28	0	Male	Asian	California	Hanging	
141	November 24, 1922	Orrie Loren Cross	26	24	2	Male	White	Iowa	Hanging	
142	December 1, 1922	Ben Brooks	34	33	1	Male	White	Indiana	Electrocution	
143	December 1, 1922	James Edward Mahoney	37	36	1	Male	White	Washington	Hanging	
144	December 4, 1922	Walter Charles Troy	31	29	2	Male	White	Pennsylvania	Electrocution	
145	December 4, 1922	Harry Way	24	23	1	Male	Black	Pennsylvania	Electrocution	
146	December 11, 1922	Joseph H. Thomas	41	39	2	Male	Black	Pennsylvania	Electrocution	
147	December 15, 1922	Myron Corbridge	21	21	0	Male	White	Illinois	Hanging	
148	December 22, 1922	Frank Marselone Jeffords	30	29	1	Male	White	South Carolina	Electrocution	

== Demographics ==
Gender
Male	147	99%
Female	1	1%
Ethnicity
White	80	54%
Black	54	36%
Hispanic	11	7%
Asian	3	2%
State
Pennsylvania	27	18%
New York	17	11%
Ohio	12	8%
Tennessee	11	7%
Virginia	7	5%
Alabama	6	4%
New Mexico	6	4%
South Carolina	6	4%
California	5	3%
Georgia	5	3%
New Jersey	5	3%
Arizona	3	2%
Iowa	3	2%
Louisiana	3	2%
Mississippi	3	2%
North Carolina	3	2%
Oregon	3	2%
Illinois	2	1%
Indiana	2	1%
Maryland	2	1%
Oklahoma	2	1%
Texas	2	1%
Utah	2	1%
West Virginia	2	1%
Arkansas	1	1%
Colorado	1	1%
Connecticut	1	1%
District of Columbia	1	1%
Florida	1	1%
Kentucky	1	1%
Montana	1	1%
Nebraska	1	1%
Washington	1	1%
Method
Electrocution	95	64%
Hanging	51	34%
Firing squad	2	1%
Month
January	16	11%
February	15	10%
March	21	14%
April	8	5%
May	12	8%
June	19	13%
July	14	9%
August	6	4%
September	14	9%
October	10	7%
November	6	4%
December	7	5%
Age
Unknown	16	11%
10–19	10	7%
20–29	66	45%
30–39	37	25%
40–49	10	7%
50–59	8	5%
60–69	1	1%
Total	148	100%

== Executions in recent years ==
Number of executions
1923	114
1922	148
1921	143
Total	405

Preceded by 1921	List of people executed in the United States in 1922	Succeeded by 1923
