= List of people executed in the United States in 1923 =

One hundred and fourteen people, all male, were executed in the United States in 1923, sixty-four by electrocution, forty-nine by hanging, and one by firing squad.

Texas carried out its last executions by hanging prior to the introduction of the electric chair in 1924.

== List of people executed in the United States in 1923 ==
No.	Date of execution	Name	Age of person			Gender	Ethnicity	State	Method	Ref.
No.	Date of execution	Name	At execution	At offense	Age difference	Gender	Ethnicity	State	Method	Ref.
1	January 5, 1923	Willie Clayton	23	Unknown	Unknown	Male	Black	Virginia	Electrocution	
2	January 12, 1923	Eugene Payne	Unknown	Unknown	2	Male	White	Florida	Hanging	
3	January 25, 1923	Henry Brown	23	Unknown	Unknown	Male	Black	New York	Electrocution	
4	January 26, 1923	Felipe Bisquere	20	20	0	Male	Asian	California	Hanging	
5	January 26, 1923	Bennie Bibbs	28	Unknown	Unknown	Male	Black	Kentucky	Electrocution	
6	January 26, 1923	Tom Nichols	29	29	0	Male	Black	Kentucky	Electrocution	
7	January 26, 1923	Ludie Clifford Shelton	24	19	5	Male	Black	Ohio	Electrocution	
8	February 2, 1923	Duncan Richardson	29	28	1	Male	White	Arkansas	Electrocution	
9	February 2, 1923	Ben Richardson	19	18	1	Male	White	Arkansas	Electrocution	
10	February 2, 1923	E.G. Bullen	50	49	1	Male	White	Arkansas	Electrocution	
11	February 2, 1923	Will Debord	32	Unknown	Unknown	Male	White	Arkansas	Electrocution	
12	February 2, 1923	Thomas Johnson	16	16	0	Male	Black	South Carolina	Electrocution	
13	February 6, 1923	Alvin W. Harris	22	21	1	Male	Black	Virginia	Electrocution	
14	February 9, 1923	Glenna Martin Bolton	25	24	1	Male	White	Montana	Hanging	
15	February 9, 1923	Joseph B. Reagin	22	20	2	Male	White	Montana	Hanging	
16	February 13, 1923	William E. Battles	19	19	0	Male	Black	New Jersey	Electrocution	
17	February 15, 1923	Arlie J. Westling	38	36	2	Male	White	New York	Electrocution	
18	February 15, 1923	Joseph Zampelli	25	21	4	Male	White	New York	Electrocution	
19	February 16, 1923	Angelo Giurlando	Unknown	Unknown	Unknown	Male	White	Louisiana	Hanging	
20	February 16, 1923	Jim Marks	Unknown	Unknown	Unknown	Male	Black	Mississippi	Hanging	
21	February 16, 1923	Charles W. Habig	32	30	2	Male	White	Ohio	Electrocution	
22	February 16, 1923	Ira James Harrison	22	21	1	Male	White	South Carolina	Electrocution	
23	February 21, 1923	LeRoy Hollins	22	22	0	Male	Black	Illinois	Hanging	
24	February 21, 1923	Earnest Williams	29	28	1	Male	Black	Illinois	Hanging	
25	February 23, 1923	George Donnelly	54	52	2	Male	White	California	Hanging	
26	March 1, 1923	Robert Williams	Unknown	Unknown	0	Male	Black	North Carolina	Electrocution	
27	March 1, 1923	Anthony Rabacewich	34	33	1	Male	White	New York	Electrocution	
28	March 2, 1923	Gregorio Chavez	50	49	1	Male	Hispanic	California	Hanging	
29	March 2, 1923	Charles Arnold	65	64	1	Male	White	Ohio	Electrocution	
30	March 2, 1923	Henry White	42	41	1	Male	Black	Ohio	Electrocution	
31	March 2, 1923	George Wriggins	31	Unknown	Unknown	Male	Black	Virginia	Electrocution	
32	March 5, 1923	Floyd Lewis Smith	28	25	3	Male	White	Pennsylvania	Electrocution	
33	March 9, 1923	Ernest A. Shands	27	26	1	Male	Black	District of Columbia	Hanging	
34	March 9, 1923	Earl Llewellyn Throst	26	25	1	Male	White	Iowa	Hanging	
35	March 9, 1923	Husted A. Walters	27	24	3	Male	White	Oregon	Hanging	
36	March 16, 1923	Jake Terry	26	Unknown	Unknown	Male	Black	South Carolina	Electrocution	
37	March 30, 1923	Percy Bayliss	Unknown	Unknown	1	Male	Black	Florida	Hanging	
38	April 6, 1923	Bishop Hawkins	Unknown	Unknown	Unknown	Male	Black	Maryland	Hanging	
39	April 6, 1923	Francisco Vaisa	32	30	2	Male	Hispanic	New Mexico	Hanging	
40	April 7, 1923	Harvey Leon Hughes	22	21	1	Male	White	Texas	Hanging	
41	April 13, 1923	Paul V. Hadley	35	33	2	Male	White	Arizona	Hanging	
42	April 13, 1923	Ullah Mohammed	32	Unknown	Unknown	Male	Arab	California	Hanging	
43	April 13, 1923	Stanley Forbes	27	26	1	Male	White	Ohio	Electrocution	
44	April 16, 1923	Johnson Hopkins	Unknown	Unknown	1	Male	Black	Louisiana	Hanging	
45	April 20, 1923	George Spencer Banton	20	19	1	Male	Black	District of Columbia	Hanging	
46	April 20, 1923	Monte Harris	23	21	2	Male	White	Montana	Hanging	
47	April 20, 1923	William Harris	Unknown	Unknown	2	Male	White	Montana	Hanging	
48	April 26, 1923	Michael Fradiano	50	48	2	Male	White	New York	Electrocution	
49	April 26, 1923	Joseph Alfano	24	21	3	Male	White	New York	Electrocution	
50	April 26, 1923	William J. Evans	24	23	1	Male	White	New York	Electrocution	
51	April 27, 1923	Nealey Augusta	Unknown	Unknown	1	Male	Black	Florida	Hanging	
52	April 27, 1923	George Malcolm Baker	23	22	1	Male	White	Georgia	Hanging	
53	April 27, 1923	William McQueen Hardison	16	15	1	Male	Black	North Carolina	Electrocution	
54	April 27, 1923	Noble Perkins Holt	31	30	1	Male	White	Ohio	Electrocution	
55	May 3, 1923	Charles Price	32	27	5	Male	Black	District of Columbia	Hanging	
56	May 4, 1923	T. Marui	45	43	2	Male	Asian	California	Hanging	
57	May 9, 1923	Wiley Perry	31	29	2	Male	Black	North Carolina	Electrocution	
58	May 15, 1923	Henry Banks	22	21	1	Male	Black	Kentucky	Electrocution	
59	May 18, 1923	Emile Jenkins	Unknown	Unknown	0	Male	Black	Louisiana	Hanging	
60	May 21, 1923	Clarence Newson	37	Unknown	Unknown	Male	Black	Pennsylvania	Electrocution	
61	May 24, 1923	George Samuel Epps	31	29	2	Male	Black	District of Columbia	Hanging	
62	June 7, 1923	Thomas J. Kindlon Jr.	21	20	1	Male	White	New York	Electrocution	
63	June 7, 1923	Thomas W. Lester	24	23	1	Male	White	New York	Electrocution	
64	June 8, 1923	Willie Golson	30	30	0	Male	Black	Alabama	Hanging	
65	June 8, 1923	Ben Moore	Unknown	Unknown	1	Male	Black	Alabama	Hanging	
66	June 8, 1923	George Chelton	21	21	0	Male	Black	Maryland	Hanging	
67	June 15, 1923	Casper Pastoni	32	31	1	Male	White	Illinois	Hanging	
68	June 15, 1923	James Elder Powers	22	21	1	Male	White	Kentucky	Electrocution	
69	June 22, 1923	Lawrence C. Campbell	18	18	0	Male	White	California	Hanging	
70	June 22, 1923	Key Pendleton Smith	36	35	1	Male	Native American	New York	Electrocution	
71	June 22, 1923	Eugene Adams	20	20	0	Male	Black	South Carolina	Electrocution	
72	June 23, 1923	Rufus Gordon	37	33	4	Male	Black	District of Columbia	Hanging	
73	June 25, 1923	Sam Riddick	32	30	2	Male	Black	Virginia	Electrocution	
74	June 26, 1923	Daniel Milton Nobles	34	34	0	Male	White	North Carolina	Electrocution	
75	June 28, 1923	Ed Dill	53	52	1	Male	Black	North Carolina	Electrocution	
76	June 29, 1923	Mauro Parisi	28	27	1	Male	White	California	Hanging	
77	July 2, 1923	Marcus W. Newman	29	27	2	Male	Black	Pennsylvania	Electrocution	
78	July 12, 1923	Robert Blackstone	27	26	1	Male	Black	New York	Electrocution	
79	July 13, 1923	James Wellions	39	38	1	Male	Black	Ohio	Electrocution	
80	July 14, 1923	Paul Dascalakis	30	26	4	Male	White	Massachusetts	Electrocution	
81	July 20, 1923	George Allen	58	Unknown	Unknown	Male	Black	South Carolina	Electrocution	
82	July 20, 1923	Sol Johnson	Unknown	Unknown	1	Male	Black	Texas	Hanging	
83	July 27, 1923	Herbert Craton Sease	40	39	1	Male	White	Arkansas	Electrocution	
84	July 27, 1923	Arthur Johnson	Unknown	Unknown	0	Male	Black	Florida	Hanging	
85	July 30, 1923	Roy Mitchell	30	29	1	Male	Black	Texas	Hanging	
86	August 3, 1923	Jung Sam	35	34	1	Male	Asian	California	Hanging	
87	August 10, 1923	Manuel Martinez	28	25	3	Male	Hispanic	Arizona	Hanging	
88	August 24, 1923	John Wylie Owens	51	50	1	Male	White	Arkansas	Electrocution	
89	August 24, 1923	Dan Casey	Unknown	Unknown	2	Male	White	Oregon	Hanging	
90	August 30, 1923	Raffaele Amendola	34	33	1	Male	White	New York	Electrocution	
91	August 31, 1923	John Oden Murphy	31	31	0	Male	White	Louisiana	Hanging	
92	August 31, 1923	Nathan Lee Sr.	38	37	1	Male	Black	Texas	Hanging	
93	August 31, 1923	George Henry Gardner	39	38	1	Male	White	Utah	Firing squad	
94	September 6, 1923	Adam Logan Roberts	41	41	0	Male	Black	Ohio	Electrocution	
95	September 7, 1923	William Carl Olander	29	27	2	Male	White	Iowa	Hanging	
96	September 28, 1923	Robert Corbett	35	Unknown	Unknown	Male	Black	Virginia	Electrocution	
97	October 5, 1923	Jim Miller	Unknown	Unknown	1	Male	Black	North Carolina	Electrocution	
98	October 26, 1923	Cleofe Ruiz	38	Unknown	Unknown	Male	Hispanic	Hawaii Territory	Hanging	
99	November 2, 1923	Irvin Layer	38	37	1	Male	White	Ohio	Electrocution	
100	November 2, 1923	George Banhage	Unknown	Unknown	Unknown	Male	White	West Virginia	Hanging	
101	November 16, 1923	Walter Irwin	Unknown	Unknown	Unknown	Male	Black	Louisiana	Hanging	
102	November 23, 1923	John Lawrence Revels	30	29	1	Male	White	Florida	Hanging	
103	December 6, 1923	Emilio Semione	38	35	3	Male	White	New York	Electrocution	
104	December 7, 1923	John Goss	44	43	1	Male	Black	North Carolina	Electrocution	
105	December 7, 1923	John Karayians	34	33	1	Male	White	Ohio	Electrocution	
106	December 10, 1923	Marcantonio Daniele	41	40	1	Male	White	Pennsylvania	Electrocution	
107	December 10, 1923	Angelo Fragassa	29	27	2	Male	White	Pennsylvania	Electrocution	
108	December 13, 1923	Abraham Becker	35	34	1	Male	White	New York	Electrocution	
109	December 13, 1923	George William Hacker Jr.	34	34	0	Male	White	New York	Electrocution	
110	December 13, 1923	Harry Santanello	29	27	2	Male	White	New York	Electrocution	
111	December 21, 1923	Frank Gaines	26	26	0	Male	Black	South Carolina	Electrocution	
112	December 21, 1923	Julius Garvin	28	28	0	Male	Black	South Carolina	Electrocution	
113	December 28, 1923	Lee Washington	20	20	0	Male	Black	North Carolina	Electrocution	
114	December 31, 1923	Chester Ingram	23	23	0	Male	Black	Pennsylvania	Electrocution	

== Demographics ==
Gender
Male	114	100%
Female	0	0%
Ethnicity
Black	53	46%
White	53	46%
Hispanic	4	4%
Asian	3	3%
Arab	1	1%
Native American	1	1%
State
New York	16	14%
Ohio	10	9%
California	8	7%
North Carolina	8	7%
South Carolina	7	6%
Arkansas	6	5%
Pennsylvania	6	5%
District of Columbia	5	4%
Florida	5	4%
Louisiana	5	4%
Virginia	5	4%
Kentucky	4	4%
Montana	4	4%
Texas	4	4%
Illinois	3	3%
Alabama	2	2%
Arizona	2	2%
Iowa	2	2%
Maryland	2	2%
Oregon	2	2%
Georgia	1	1%
Hawaii Territory	1	1%
Massachusetts	1	1%
Mississippi	1	1%
New Jersey	1	1%
New Mexico	1	1%
Utah	1	1%
West Virginia	1	1%
Method
Electrocution	64	56%
Hanging	49	43%
Firing squad	1	1%
Month
January	7	6%
February	18	16%
March	12	11%
April	17	15%
May	7	6%
June	15	13%
July	9	8%
August	8	7%
September	3	3%
October	2	2%
November	4	4%
December	12	11%
Age
Unknown	17	15%
10–19	5	4%
20–29	43	38%
30–39	35	31%
40–49	6	5%
50–59	7	6%
60–69	1	1%
Total	114	100%

== Executions in recent years ==
Number of executions
1924	127
1923	114
1922	148
Total	389

Preceded by 1922	List of people executed in the United States in 1923	Succeeded by 1924
