= List of people executed in the United States in 1920 =

One hundred and three people, all male, were executed in the United States in 1920, fifty-nine by electrocution, and forty-four by hanging.

== List of people executed in the United States in 1920 ==
| No. | Date of execution | Name | Age of person | | | Gender | Ethnicity | State | Method | Ref. |
| No. | Date of execution | Name | At execution | At offense | Age difference | Gender | Ethnicity | State | Method | Ref. |
|---|---|---|---|---|---|---|---|---|---|---|
| 1 | January 2, 1920 | Marquis Lafayette Newell | 36 | 36 | 0 | Male | White | California | Hanging | |
| 2 | January 2, 1920 | Raffaelo Durazzio | 33 | Unknown | Unknown | Male | White | Illinois | Hanging | |
| 3 | January 5, 1920 | Robert Henry Brown | 30 | 28 | 2 | Male | Black | Pennsylvania | Electrocution | |
| 4 | January 8, 1920 | Vincenzo Esposito | 31 | 27 | 4 | Male | White | New York | Electrocution | |
| 5 | January 8, 1920 | Winford Walker | 17 | 16 | 1 | Male | Black | Tennessee | Electrocution | |
| 6 | January 16, 1920 | Allen Spight | Unknown | Unknown | 0 | Male | Black | Mississippi | Hanging | |
| 7 | January 16, 1920 | Churchill L. Godley | 34 | 33 | 1 | Male | White | North Carolina | Electrocution | |
| 8 | January 29, 1920 | Gordon Fawcett Hamby | 27 | 26 | 1 | Male | White | New York | Electrocution | |
| 9 | February 9, 1920 | Lawrence Brown | 20 | 19 | 1 | Male | Black | Pennsylvania | Electrocution | |
| 10 | February 9, 1920 | William Hiter | 21 | 20 | 1 | Male | Black | Pennsylvania | Electrocution | |
| 11 | February 20, 1920 | John O'Brien | 21 | 20 | 1 | Male | White | Illinois | Hanging | |
| 12 | February 20, 1920 | Melvin Calhoun | Unknown | Unknown | 0 | Male | Black | Louisiana | Hanging | |
| 13 | March 1, 1920 | Lazarus Bollin | 17 | 16 | 1 | Male | Black | Pennsylvania | Electrocution | |
| 14 | March 1, 1920 | Boza Drascovich | 23 | 20 | 3 | Male | White | Pennsylvania | Electrocution | |
| 15 | March 2, 1920 | James Henry Jackson | 27 | 26 | 1 | Male | Black | District of Columbia | Hanging | |
| 16 | March 5, 1920 | Daniel Cerrone | 31 | Unknown | Unknown | Male | White | Connecticut | Hanging | |
| 17 | March 5, 1920 | Sanford Gardner Cain | 41 | 39 | 2 | Male | White | North Carolina | Electrocution | |
| 18 | March 5, 1920 | Joseph Albert Cain | 38 | 37 | 1 | Male | White | North Carolina | Electrocution | |
| 19 | March 9, 1920 | Jacob D. Edinger | 26 | Unknown | Unknown | Male | White | Ohio | Electrocution | |
| 20 | March 9, 1920 | Edward Ness | 30 | Unknown | Unknown | Male | White | Ohio | Electrocution | |
| 21 | March 10, 1920 | Charles Music | 24 | 23 | 1 | Male | White | Kentucky | Electrocution | |
| 22 | March 11, 1920 | Petrie "Will Lockett" Kimbrough | 31 | 31 | 0 | Male | Black | Kentucky | Electrocution | |
| 23 | March 23, 1920 | John Dodd Price | 42 | 42 | 0 | Male | Black | Texas | Hanging | |
| 24 | March 26, 1920 | Eli McGuire | Unknown | Unknown | 1 | Male | Black | Louisiana | Hanging | |
| 25 | March 29, 1920 | Frank Green | 34 | 32 | 2 | Male | Black | Pennsylvania | Electrocution | |
| 26 | March 31, 1920 | Vincenzo Damico | 24 | 23 | 1 | Male | White | Ohio | Electrocution | |
| 27 | April 16, 1920 | Simplicio Torrez | 24 | 23 | 1 | Male | Hispanic | Arizona | Hanging | |
| 28 | April 16, 1920 | William Yancy Mills | 20 | 19 | 1 | Male | Black | Illinois | Hanging | |
| 29 | April 27, 1920 | Buck Dunmore | 21 | 19 | 2 | Male | Black | Pennsylvania | Electrocution | |
| 30 | April 30, 1920 | Fred Shelton | Unknown | Unknown | 0 | Male | Black | Georgia | Hanging | |
| 31 | April 30, 1920 | Hugh Jackson Bragg | 21 | 21 | 0 | Male | White | West Virginia | Hanging | |
| 32 | May 3, 1920 | Samuel Dolish | 35 | 33 | 2 | Male | White | Pennsylvania | Electrocution | |
| 33 | May 13, 1920 | Chester D. Cantine | 21 | 20 | 1 | Male | White | New York | Electrocution | |
| 34 | May 13, 1920 | Richard Harrison | 26 | 24 | 2 | Male | White | New York | Electrocution | |
| 35 | May 28, 1920 | Willie Lamerson | Unknown | Unknown | Unknown | Male | Black | Louisiana | Hanging | |
| 36 | May 28, 1920 | Leo Jankowski | 26 | 25 | 1 | Male | White | New York | Electrocution | |
| 37 | May 28, 1920 | Walter Levandowski | 25 | 24 | 1 | Male | White | New York | Electrocution | |
| 38 | June 1, 1920 | Benny Rowland | 20 | 18 | 2 | Male | Black | Pennsylvania | Electrocution | |
| 39 | June 1, 1920 | William Russell | 22 | 21 | 1 | Male | Black | Pennsylvania | Electrocution | |
| 40 | June 1, 1920 | Edward Brown | 48 | 46 | 2 | Male | Black | Pennsylvania | Electrocution | |
| 41 | July 9, 1920 | Mark Peters | Unknown | Unknown | 2 | Male | Black | Louisiana | Hanging | |
| | July 9, 1920 | Elbert W. Blancett | 25 | 21 | 4 | Male | White | New Mexico | Hanging | |
| 42 | July 9, 1920 | Lee Monroe Betterton | 48 | 47 | 1 | Male | White | Oklahoma | Electrocution | |
| 43 | July 16, 1920 | Will Stover | Unknown | Unknown | Unknown | Male | Black | Alabama | Hanging | |
| 44 | July 20, 1920 | Charles H. Ivy | 65 | 64 | 1 | Male | White | Mississippi | Hanging | |
| 45 | July 22, 1920 | James Montague Byrd | 26 | Unknown | Unknown | Male | Black | New York | Electrocution | |
| 46 | July 23, 1920 | Robert Blackwell | 30 | 26 | 4 | Male | White | Florida | Hanging | |
| 47 | July 23, 1920 | Isaiah Fountain | Unknown | Unknown | 1 | Male | Black | Maryland | Hanging | |
| 48 | July 29, 1920 | Elmer Henry Hyatt | 20 | 19 | 1 | Male | White | New York | Electrocution | |
| 49 | July 30, 1920 | Edgar Charles Caldwell | 28 | 26 | 2 | Male | Black | Alabama | Hanging | |
| 50 | July 30, 1920 | Hosea Poole | Unknown | Unknown | Unknown | Male | Black | Florida | Hanging | |
| 51 | August 5, 1920 | William Ray | 18 | 17 | 1 | Male | Black | Indiana | Electrocution | |
| 52 | August 6, 1920 | John Maxwell | 20 | Unknown | Unknown | Male | Black | South Carolina | Electrocution | |
| 53 | August 13, 1920 | Frank Bailey | Unknown | Unknown | 2 | Male | Black | Louisiana | Hanging | |
| 54 | August 14, 1920 | Victor Tobay | 24 | 24 | 0 | Male | Native American | Arkansas | Electrocution | |
| 55 | August 16, 1920 | Francisco Feci | 37 | 35 | 2 | Male | White | Massachusetts | Electrocution | |
| 56 | August 20, 1920 | Charles Jasper | Unknown | Unknown | 0 | Male | Black | Georgia | Hanging | |
| 57 | August 20, 1920 | Charles Marshall | 34 | 34 | 0 | Male | White | Mississippi | Hanging | |
| 58 | August 27, 1920 | T. Niino | 40 | 39 | 1 | Male | Asian | California | Hanging | |
| 59 | August 27, 1920 | John P. Egan | 25 | Unknown | Unknown | Male | White | New York | Electrocution | |
| 60 | August 27, 1920 | Frank Kelly | 40 | Unknown | Unknown | Male | Black | New York | Electrocution | |
| 61 | September 3, 1920 | Alfred Lane | 36 | 36 | 0 | Male | White | Montana | Hanging | |
| 62 | September 3, 1920 | Lorenzo Young | 25 | 24 | 1 | Male | Black | Tennessee | Electrocution | |
| 63 | September 9, 1920 | Walter Bojanowski | 28 | 26 | 2 | Male | White | New York | Electrocution | |
| 64 | September 10, 1920 | Henry Lloyd | Unknown | Unknown | Unknown | Male | Black | Mississippi | Hanging | |
| 65 | September 14, 1920 | Camill Martin | 25 | 23 | 2 | Male | White | New Jersey | Electrocution | |
| 66 | September 17, 1920 | Edward Doyle | 26 | 25 | 1 | Male | White | Louisiana | Hanging | |
| 67 | September 17, 1920 | Cornelius Tillman | Unknown | Unknown | Unknown | Male | Black | Louisiana | Hanging | |
| 68 | September 20, 1920 | Ralph Connor | 20 | 19 | 1 | Male | Black | North Carolina | Electrocution | |
| 69 | September 24, 1920 | Mose Gibson | 36 | 36 | 0 | Male | Black | California | Hanging | |
| 70 | September 24, 1920 | James Washington | 25 | 25 | 0 | Male | Black | South Carolina | Electrocution | |
| 71 | October 14, 1920 | Frank Campione | 23 | Unknown | Unknown | Male | White | Illinois | Hanging | |
| 72 | October 14, 1920 | John Henry Reese | 40 | Unknown | Unknown | Male | Black | Illinois | Hanging | |
| 73 | October 27, 1920 | Frank Bowman | 39 | 35 | 4 | Male | Black | District of Columbia | Hanging | |
| 74 | October 29, 1920 | Paul "Arthur Collins" Ponovich | 22 | 22 | 0 | Male | White | California | Hanging | |
| 75 | November 1, 1920 | John A. Morrison | 26 | 23 | 3 | Male | White | Pennsylvania | Electrocution | |
| 76 | November 1, 1920 | Samuel Coles | 23 | 20 | 3 | Male | Black | Pennsylvania | Electrocution | |
| 77 | November 5, 1920 | Andrew Jackson | 30 | Unknown | Unknown | Male | Black | North Carolina | Electrocution | |
| 78 | November 5, 1920 | Emmett D. Bancroft | 29 | 29 | 0 | Male | White | Oregon | Hanging | |
| 79 | November 13, 1920 | Robert Williams | 23 | Unknown | Unknown | Male | Black | Virginia | Electrocution | |
| 80 | November 17, 1920 | Frank Zagar | 22 | 19 | 3 | Male | White | Illinois | Hanging | |
| 81 | November 19, 1920 | Charlie Cooper | Unknown | Unknown | 0 | Male | Black | Arkansas | Electrocution | |
| 82 | November 19, 1920 | Arthur E. Haensel | 29 | 27 | 2 | Male | White | Illinois | Hanging | |
| 83 | November 26, 1920 | Ernest Thomas | 21 | 21 | 0 | Male | Black | Delaware | Hanging | |
| 84 | December 3, 1920 | Ong Mon Foo | 22 | 21 | 1 | Male | Asian | California | Hanging | |
| 85 | December 3, 1920 | Lemuel Price | 24 | 23 | 1 | Male | Black | Delaware | Hanging | |
| 86 | December 3, 1920 | Tom Johnson | 20 | 19 | 1 | Male | Black | North Carolina | Electrocution | |
| 87 | December 3, 1920 | Arthur McDowell | 30 | 30 | 0 | Male | Black | North Carolina | Electrocution | |
| 88 | December 9, 1920 | Howard I. Baker | 21 | 20 | 1 | Male | White | New York | Electrocution | |
| 89 | December 9, 1920 | James P. Cassidy | 27 | 25 | 2 | Male | White | New York | Electrocution | |
| 90 | December 9, 1920 | Charles McLaughlin | 23 | 21 | 2 | Male | White | New York | Electrocution | |
| 91 | December 9, 1920 | Joseph Milano | 23 | 21 | 2 | Male | White | New York | Electrocution | |
| 92 | December 9, 1920 | Joseph Usefof | 23 | 21 | 2 | Male | White | New York | Electrocution | |
| 93 | December 10, 1920 | George Bosko | 29 | 28 | 1 | Male | White | Colorado | Hanging | |
| 94 | December 10, 1920 | Nicholas Vianna | 19 | Unknown | Unknown | Male | White | Illinois | Hanging | |
| 95 | December 10, 1920 | Will Thornton | 21 | 21 | 0 | Male | Black | Indiana | Electrocution | |
| 96 | December 13, 1920 | William Johnson | 47 | Unknown | Unknown | Male | Black | Pennsylvania | Electrocution | |
| 97 | December 13, 1920 | Jennaro Sansone | 24 | Unknown | Unknown | Male | White | Pennsylvania | Electrocution | |
| 98 | December 14, 1920 | Grover Butler | 25 | 24 | 1 | Male | Black | South Carolina | Electrocution | |
| 99 | December 17, 1920 | Maher Singh | 30 | 29 | 1 | Male | Asian | California | Hanging | |
| 100 | December 20, 1920 | Alson B. Cole Jr. | 24 | 21 | 3 | Male | White | Nebraska | Electrocution | |
| 101 | December 20, 1920 | Allen Vincent Grammer | 24 | 21 | 3 | Male | White | Nebraska | Electrocution | |
| 102 | December 20, 1920 | Lindsey Moore | 30 | 28 | 2 | Male | Black | Pennsylvania | Electrocution | |

== Demographics ==
Gender
| Male | 103 | 100% |
| Female | 0 | 0% |
Ethnicity
| Black | 50 | 49% |
| White | 48 | 47% |
| Asian | 3 | 3% |
| Hispanic | 1 | 1% |
| Native American | 1 | 1% |
State
| New York | 16 | 16% |
| Pennsylvania | 16 | 16% |
| Illinois | 8 | 8% |
| Louisiana | 7 | 7% |
| North Carolina | 7 | 7% |
| California | 6 | 6% |
| Mississippi | 4 | 4% |
| Ohio | 3 | 3% |
| South Carolina | 3 | 3% |
| Alabama | 2 | 2% |
| Arkansas | 2 | 2% |
| Delaware | 2 | 2% |
| District of Columbia | 2 | 2% |
| Florida | 2 | 2% |
| Georgia | 2 | 2% |
| Indiana | 2 | 2% |
| Kentucky | 2 | 2% |
| Nebraska | 2 | 2% |
| Tennessee | 2 | 2% |
| Arizona | 1 | 1% |
| Colorado | 1 | 1% |
| Connecticut | 1 | 1% |
| Maryland | 1 | 1% |
| Massachusetts | 1 | 1% |
| Montana | 1 | 1% |
| New Mexico | 1 | 1% |
| New Jersey | 1 | 1% |
| Oklahoma | 1 | 1% |
| Oregon | 1 | 1% |
| Texas | 1 | 1% |
| Virginia | 1 | 1% |
| West Virginia | 1 | 1% |
Method
| Electrocution | 59 | 57% |
| Hanging | 44 | 43% |
Month
| January | 8 | 8% |
| February | 4 | 4% |
| March | 14 | 14% |
| April | 5 | 5% |
| May | 6 | 6% |
| June | 3 | 3% |
| July | 11 | 11% |
| August | 10 | 10% |
| September | 10 | 10% |
| October | 4 | 4% |
| November | 9 | 9% |
| December | 19 | 18% |
Age
| Unknown | 14 | 14% |
| 10–19 | 4 | 4% |
| 20–29 | 55 | 53% |
| 30–39 | 21 | 20% |
| 40–49 | 8 | 8% |
| 50–59 | 0 | 0% |
| 60–69 | 1 | 1% |
| Total | 103 | 100% |

== Executions in recent years ==
Number of executions
| 1921 | 143 |
| 1920 | 103 |
| 1919 | 64 |
| Total | 310 |

| Preceded by 1919 | List of people executed in the United States in 1920 | Succeeded by 1921 |
