= Frank Carter (murderer) =

Irish murderer

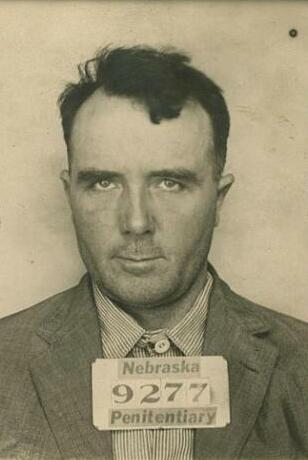
- Carter in 1926
- Born: Patrick Murphy; Unknown date, c. 1881; County Mayo, Ireland
- Died: June 24, 1927 (aged 46); Nebraska State Penitentiary, Nebraska, U.S.
- Other name: The Omaha Sniper
- Status: Executed by electrocution
- Conviction: First degree murder
- Penalty: Death

Details
- State: Nebraska
- Killed: 2 confirmed (43 claimed)
- Weapon: .22-caliber Riesing semi-automatic pistol w/ Maxim silencer

Frank Carter (1881 – June 24, 1927) was a murderer and self-confessed serial killer. Confirmed to have committed two murders, Carter claimed to have murdered 43 people. However, reporters doubted most of his claims. The Lexington Herald-Leader called most of the alleged murders "obviously fictitious".

== Crimes ==
Carter was born in County Mayo, Ireland, as Patrick Murphy.

In 1916, Carter was sentenced to 10 years in Iowa for maliciously killing a herd of dairy cattle belonging to Otto Schoeneman, whom he'd worked for as a farmhand five years earlier. He killed the animals as revenge for being fired after an argument. After being sent to prison, Carter warned Schoeneman, "I'll get you when I get out." Carter was paroled in 1920. In 1925, Carter threatened Verne Schoeneman, the son of Otto Schoeneman. One evening, Verne heard someone quietly entering his house from the back door and walking up the steps. Believing it was Carter, he opened fire, killing the man. However, the victim turned out to be his new farmhand, Charles Van Meeteren. Verne immediately called a doctor and tried to save Van Meeteren, but he died at the scene.

Verne was charged with manslaughter. However, he later pleaded guilty to a lesser count of assault to commit great bodily injury and was sentenced to a year in prison. His prison sentence was later suspended by Governor John Hammill.

The crimes for which Carter is known began in Omaha, Nebraska, where he worked as a laborer, in the 1920s. In early February 1926, a mechanic was murdered with a .22 caliber pistol with a silencer attached. Soon after, Dr. Austin Searles was murdered, and then a railroad detective was shot six times in neighboring Council Bluffs, Iowa. On February 15, Omaha's newspapers recommended the city black out all lights after an exposé on previous murders showed that the victims had been standing in their windows at home when they were shot. During daylight hours, the sniper shot another victim in the face and fired through more than a dozen lighted windows. Businesses in Omaha came to a standstill, streets cleared, and the city's entertainment venues emptied for more than a week. Other crimes included shooting indiscriminately into a Downtown Omaha drugstore.

More than two weeks after his first murder, Carter was captured in Iowa, 30 miles south of Council Bluffs at Bartlett in Fremont County, Iowa. Carter readily admitted his crimes. After a month-long trial where Carter's lawyers pleaded insanity, Carter was convicted of first degree murder for killing Dr. Austin Searles. He was also charged with first degree murder for killing mechanic William McDevitt, but that charge was withdrawn. After his conviction, Carter further admitted to being a parole breaker. (He had been released from the Iowa State Penitentiary in 1925, after serving time for killing cattle.) Frank Carter's Nebraska Prison Number was #9277.

Carter was executed by electrocution on June 24, 1927, at the Nebraska State Penitentiary in Lincoln, Nebraska. He was quoted as saying "Let the juice flow" just before he died.

== See also ==
- List of people executed in Nebraska (pre-1972)
- List of people executed in the United States in 1927
