= List of people executed in the United States in 1925 =

One hundred and forty-four people, all male, were executed in the United States in 1925, ninety-six by electrocution, forty-six by hanging, and two by firing squad.

== List of people executed in the United States in 1925 ==
No.	Date of execution	Name	Age of person			Gender	Ethnicity	State	Method	Ref.
No.	Date of execution	Name	At execution	At offense	Age difference	Gender	Ethnicity	State	Method	Ref.
1	January 2, 1925	Archie Burris	33	30	3	Male	Black	Iowa	Hanging	
2	January 5, 1925	Kenneth Hale	17	17	0	Male	Black	North Carolina	Electrocution	
3	January 5, 1925	John Leak	Unknown	Unknown	0	Male	Black	North Carolina	Electrocution	
4	January 8, 1925	John Emieleta	21	20	1	Male	White	New York	Electrocution	
5	January 8, 1925	John Rys	19	18	1	Male	White	New York	Electrocution	
6	January 9, 1925	Sam Flowers	36	34	2	Male	Black	Arizona	Hanging	
7	January 9, 1925	Walter Vernon Yeager	42	41	1	Male	White	California	Hanging	
8	January 9, 1925	Joseph Clarence Kane	21	20	1	Male	White	Ohio	Electrocution	
9	January 14, 1925	Ben Burchfield	44	42	2	Male	White	Tennessee	Electrocution	
10	January 15, 1925	Ralph Thomas	42	41	1	Male	Black	District of Columbia	Hanging	
11	January 15, 1925	Ambrose Geary	38	37	1	Male	White	New York	Electrocution	
12	January 15, 1925	Harry F. Malcolm	34	33	1	Male	White	New York	Electrocution	
13	January 15, 1925	Edward C. Smith	37	36	1	Male	White	New York	Electrocution	
14	January 16, 1925	Jack Ferdinand	30	29	1	Male	White	California	Hanging	
15	January 16, 1925	John Sears	21	20	1	Male	White	California	Hanging	
16	January 16, 1925	John Geregac	22	21	1	Male	White	California	Hanging	
17	January 16, 1925	Hess Conners	22	22	0	Male	Black	Illinois	Hanging	
18	January 22, 1925	Herbert L. Copeland	50	43	7	Male	Black	District of Columbia	Hanging	
19	January 22, 1925	John Thomas Leonard	22	21	1	Male	White	New York	Electrocution	
20	January 22, 1925	Nicholas Ferranti	42	40	2	Male	White	New York	Electrocution	
21	January 22, 1925	Florencio Lerma	25	24	1	Male	Hispanic	New York	Electrocution	
22	January 30, 1925	Peter Vergolini	29	29	0	Male	White	Indiana	Electrocution	
23	January 30, 1925	Lester Hurd	Unknown	Unknown	Unknown	Male	Black	Mississippi	Hanging	
24	January 30, 1925	Eddie Lee	Unknown	Unknown	Unknown	Male	Black	Mississippi	Hanging	
25	February 9, 1925	Wilson Bertrim Highwarden	50	49	1	Male	Black	Ohio	Electrocution	
26	February 13, 1925	Francisco Casade	42	40	2	Male	Hispanic	California	Hanging	
27	February 13, 1925	John Kammerer	47	47	0	Male	White	Illinois	Hanging	
28	February 13, 1925	John Stacey	51	51	0	Male	White	Illinois	Hanging	
29	February 13, 1925	Carroll Gibson	18	17	1	Male	Black	Maryland	Hanging	
30	February 14, 1925	Roy Walsh	22	20	2	Male	White	Montana	Hanging	
31	February 18, 1925	David Jones	39	Unknown	Unknown	Male	Black	North Carolina	Electrocution	
32	February 20, 1925	Henry Brown	54	Unknown	Unknown	Male	Black	Ohio	Electrocution	
33	February 20, 1925	Henry C. "George Allen" Hett	23	20	3	Male	White	Utah	Firing squad	
34	February 27, 1925	Clarence Bailey	26	24	2	Male	White	Alabama	Hanging	
35	March 6, 1925	Allen Germany	45	44	1	Male	Black	Alabama	Hanging	
36	March 6, 1925	Isaac Cooper	39	Unknown	Unknown	Male	Black	Virginia	Electrocution	
37	March 12, 1925	Frank H. Minnick	27	26	1	Male	White	New York	Electrocution	
38	March 12, 1925	Patrick Murphy	30	28	2	Male	White	New York	Electrocution	
39	March 12, 1925	Prince Dandridge	33	Unknown	Unknown	Male	Black	Virginia	Electrocution	
40	March 20, 1925	Leonard Griffin	25	23	2	Male	Black	Kentucky	Electrocution	
41	March 20, 1925	Sid Davis	38	36	2	Male	Black	Kentucky	Electrocution	
42	March 20, 1925	Martin Eustis Carricut	33	32	1	Male	White	Louisiana	Hanging	
43	March 20, 1925	Amos White	Unknown	Unknown	2	Male	Black	Louisiana	Hanging	
44	March 27, 1925	Charles Thomas	24	23	1	Male	Black	Ohio	Electrocution	
45	March 30, 1925	Henry Jackson	24	21	3	Male	Black	Pennsylvania	Electrocution	
46	April 3, 1925	John Sidney Welk	31	29	2	Male	White	Texas	Electrocution	
47	April 6, 1925	Charles Oefinger	33	32	1	Male	White	Pennsylvania	Electrocution	
48	April 6, 1925	Grant Adams	21	20	1	Male	White	Pennsylvania	Electrocution	
49	April 17, 1925	Charles William Stewart	55	54	1	Male	White	North Carolina	Electrocution	
50	April 17, 1925	William Elmer Stewart	23	23	0	Male	White	North Carolina	Electrocution	
51	April 17, 1925	Jesse Carter	30	30	0	Male	Black	Virginia	Electrocution	
52	April 20, 1925	Angelo Gelfo	29	28	1	Male	White	Pennsylvania	Electrocution	
53	April 21, 1925	Len Walton	29	27	2	Male	Black	North Carolina	Electrocution	
54	April 24, 1925	Clarence Reid	20	18	2	Male	White	California	Hanging	
55	April 24, 1925	Joseph Prymas	24	23	1	Male	White	Ohio	Electrocution	
56	April 27, 1925	Michael Soos	25	23	2	Male	White	Pennsylvania	Electrocution	
57	April 30, 1925	Morris Barlow Diamond	28	27	1	Male	White	New York	Electrocution	
58	April 30, 1925	Joseph Diamond	22	20	2	Male	White	New York	Electrocution	
59	April 30, 1925	John Farina	23	22	1	Male	White	New York	Electrocution	
60	May 1, 1925	Jason Cox Adkins	33	32	1	Male	White	Ohio	Electrocution	
61	May 1, 1925	Percy Lee	34	Unknown	Unknown	Male	Black	Virginia	Electrocution	
62	May 6, 1925	J.C. Coachman	Unknown	Unknown	Unknown	Male	Black	Florida	Electrocution	
63	May 8, 1925	Ronald Charles Erno	26	24	2	Male	White	California	Hanging	
64	May 8, 1925	William Singleton	Unknown	Unknown	Unknown	Male	Black	North Carolina	Electrocution	
65	May 15, 1925	Alex Williams	32	31	1	Male	Black	Georgia	Electrocution	
66	May 15, 1925	Lawrence Washington	33	32	1	Male	Black	Illinois	Hanging	
67	May 15, 1925	Pedro Cano	29	26	3	Male	Hispanic	Utah	Firing squad	
68	May 16, 1925	Fred Ward	30	29	1	Male	White	Ohio	Electrocution	
69	May 21, 1925	Robert Lee Currie	28	22	6	Male	White	Georgia	Hanging	
70	May 22, 1925	George McKay	45	44	1	Male	White	Mississippi	Hanging	
71	May 22, 1925	Arthur Covell	45	43	2	Male	White	Oregon	Hanging	
72	May 22, 1925	Llewellyn Wilson Peare	68	66	2	Male	White	Oregon	Hanging	
73	May 25, 1925	John Meleskie	34	31	3	Male	White	Pennsylvania	Electrocution	
74	May 29, 1925	Leroy Scott	22	Unknown	Unknown	Male	Black	Oklahoma	Electrocution	
75	June 1, 1925	Antonio Burchanti	Unknown	Unknown	2	Male	White	Pennsylvania	Electrocution	
76	June 1, 1925	John Torti	Unknown	Unknown	2	Male	White	Pennsylvania	Electrocution	
77	June 5, 1925	Jim Collins	19	18	1	Male	Black	North Carolina	Electrocution	
78	June 5, 1925	Carroll Orr	56	54	2	Male	Black	South Carolina	Electrocution	
79	June 5, 1925	Lavannie Twitty	24	Unknown	Unknown	Male	Black	Texas	Electrocution	
80	June 12, 1925	Willie Green	Unknown	Unknown	Unknown	Male	Black	Alabama	Hanging	
81	June 12, 1925	Will Williams	25	24	1	Male	Black	North Carolina	Electrocution	
82	June 12, 1925	Kondat Gwozdenkow	37	37	0	Male	White	Ohio	Electrocution	
83	June 19, 1925	Willis Sam	Unknown	Unknown	1	Male	Black	Illinois	Hanging	
84	June 19, 1925	George Henry Love	32	29	3	Male	Black	North Carolina	Electrocution	
85	June 26, 1925	Jack Buster	20	16	4	Male	Black	Arkansas	Electrocution	
86	June 26, 1925	Perk Flowers	22	Unknown	Unknown	Male	Black	Arkansas	Electrocution	
87	June 26, 1925	George Farrell	24	23	1	Male	White	Kentucky	Electrocution	
88	June 26, 1925	Elmer Hall	26	25	1	Male	White	Kentucky	Electrocution	
89	June 26, 1925	Richard Newhouse	22	21	1	Male	White	Kentucky	Electrocution	
90	June 29, 1925	Henry Edwards	35	34	1	Male	Black	Pennsylvania	Electrocution	
91	July 3, 1925	J.C. Williams	35	35	0	Male	Black	Alabama	Hanging	
92	July 3, 1925	Harry Armand	24	23	1	Male	Black	Kentucky	Electrocution	
93	July 3, 1925	Frank Noel Jr.	22	22	0	Male	Black	Texas	Electrocution	
94	July 3, 1925	Lorenzo Noel	23	23	0	Male	Black	Texas	Electrocution	
95	July 10, 1925	Thomas Bailey	22	21	1	Male	White	California	Hanging	
96	July 10, 1925	Edmund Montijo	21	19	2	Male	White	California	Hanging	
97	July 10, 1925	Lewis Perry	19	17	2	Male	White	California	Hanging	
98	July 10, 1925	Rodney Hubert Hoke	19	Unknown	Unknown	Male	White	Virginia	Electrocution	
99	July 17, 1925	James Crump	25	24	1	Male	Black	Missouri	Hanging	
100	July 17, 1925	Leon Williams	27	25	2	Male	Black	Missouri	Hanging	
101	July 17, 1925	Edwin Rushing	25	Unknown	Unknown	Male	Black	Texas	Electrocution	
102	July 17, 1925	Horace Allen	45	45	0	Male	Black	Virginia	Electrocution	
103	July 24, 1925	John Aloysius Connelly	38	35	3	Male	White	California	Hanging	
104	July 31, 1925	John Milton	36	35	1	Male	Black	Alabama	Hanging	
105	July 31, 1925	Charles Craig	23	22	1	Male	White	California	Hanging	
106	August 7, 1925	Lenzy Traylor	21	20	1	Male	White	Ohio	Electrocution	
107	August 7, 1925	George Clem Gray	40	38	2	Male	White	Texas	Electrocution	
108	August 11, 1925	Walter Ray Simmons	27	24	3	Male	White	Nebraska	Electrocution	
109	August 21, 1925	Harry Mack	Unknown	Unknown	0	Male	Black	Alabama	Hanging	
110	August 27, 1925	John Durkin	25	24	1	Male	White	New York	Electrocution	
111	August 28, 1925	Ray Ross	28	27	1	Male	Black	Kentucky	Hanging	
112	August 28, 1925	Draper Jeffries	31	30	1	Male	Black	South Carolina	Electrocution	
113	September 4, 1925	Cosmo Ferranto	45	39	6	Male	White	Ohio	Electrocution	
114	September 17, 1925	Julius William Miller	44	44	0	Male	Black	New York	Electrocution	
115	September 18, 1925	Calvin Walters	28	28	0	Male	Black	Ohio	Electrocution	
116	September 21, 1925	Michele Bassi	Unknown	Unknown	1	Male	White	Pennsylvania	Electrocution	
117	September 21, 1925	Tony Pezzi	Unknown	Unknown	1	Male	White	Pennsylvania	Electrocution	
118	September 26, 1925	Frank Jackson	Unknown	Unknown	0	Male	Black	Georgia	Electrocution	
119	September 28, 1925	Julius McKinley Branham	27	Unknown	Unknown	Male	Black	Pennsylvania	Electrocution	
120	September 28, 1925	John A. Walker	Unknown	Unknown	Unknown	Male	Black	Pennsylvania	Electrocution	
121	September 29, 1925	Henry Perman	28	Unknown	Unknown	Male	Black	Virginia	Electrocution	
122	October 2, 1925	John McMillan	18	18	0	Male	Black	North Carolina	Electrocution	
123	October 2, 1925	Thomas Robinson	26	26	0	Male	Black	North Carolina	Electrocution	
124	October 5, 1925	William Lyons	37	36	1	Male	Black	Pennsylvania	Electrocution	
125	October 9, 1925	Sam Greenhill	36	34	2	Male	Black	Federal government	Hanging	
126	October 9, 1925	Alfred Ballinger	41	Unknown	Unknown	Male	White	California	Hanging	
127	October 9, 1925	Doc Earl McMillan	31	Unknown	Unknown	Male	Black	Virginia	Electrocution	
128	October 10, 1925	George Dixon Sujynamie	26	26	0	Male	Native American	Federal government	Hanging	
129	October 12, 1925	Edward Stevenson	Unknown	Unknown	1	Male	Black	Pennsylvania	Electrocution	
130	October 16, 1925	Frank Lanciano	30	Unknown	Unknown	Male	White	Illinois	Hanging	
131	October 16, 1925	John Koval	32	31	1	Male	White	Indiana	Electrocution	
132	October 19, 1925	James Scott	23	22	1	Male	Black	Pennsylvania	Electrocution	
133	October 19, 1925	Anthony Wichrowski	38	37	1	Male	White	Pennsylvania	Electrocution	
134	October 26, 1925	John Girsch	20	19	1	Male	White	Pennsylvania	Electrocution	
135	October 26, 1925	Michael Weiss	21	20	1	Male	White	Pennsylvania	Electrocution	
136	November 5, 1925	Robert Milton Tate	26	25	1	Male	White	Tennessee	Electrocution	
137	November 13, 1925	Jesse Cherry Kelley	31	30	1	Male	White	Arkansas	Electrocution	
138	November 16, 1925	Harland C. Simons	26	25	1	Male	White	Iowa	Hanging	
139	November 20, 1925	Robert Little	21	20	1	Male	Black	Ohio	Electrocution	
140	November 20, 1925	Bucur Todor	40	39	1	Male	White	Ohio	Electrocution	
141	November 30, 1925	W.R. Lloyd	27	27	0	Male	White	Oregon	Hanging	
142	November 30, 1925	Philip Alfred Hartman	25	24	1	Male	White	Pennsylvania	Electrocution	
143	December 4, 1925	Johnnie Washington	29	28	1	Male	Black	Oklahoma	Electrocution	
144	December 15, 1925	Daniel Genese	25	24	1	Male	White	New Jersey	Electrocution	

== Demographics ==
Gender
Male	144	100%
Female	0	0%
Ethnicity
White	74	51%
Black	66	46%
Hispanic	3	2%
Native American	1	1%
State
Pennsylvania	20	14%
New York	15	10%
California	13	9%
Ohio	13	9%
North Carolina	12	8%
Virginia	8	6%
Kentucky	7	5%
Alabama	6	4%
Illinois	6	4%
Texas	6	4%
Arkansas	3	2%
Georgia	3	2%
Mississippi	3	2%
Oregon	3	2%
District of Columbia	2	1%
Federal government	2	1%
Indiana	2	1%
Iowa	2	1%
Louisiana	2	1%
Missouri	2	1%
Oklahoma	2	1%
South Carolina	2	1%
Tennessee	2	1%
Utah	2	1%
Arizona	1	1%
Florida	1	1%
Maryland	1	1%
Montana	1	1%
Nebraska	1	1%
New Jersey	1	1%
Method
Electrocution	96	67%
Hanging	46	32%
Firing squad	2	1%
Month
January	24	17%
February	10	7%
March	11	8%
April	14	10%
May	15	10%
June	16	11%
July	15	10%
August	7	5%
September	9	6%
October	14	10%
November	7	5%
December	2	1%
Age
Unknown	16	11%
10–19	7	5%
20–29	64	44%
30–39	35	24%
40–49	15	10%
50–59	6	4%
60–69	1	1%
Total	144	100%

== Executions in recent years ==
Number of executions
1926	141
1925	144
1924	127
Total	412

Preceded by 1924	List of people executed in the United States in 1925	Succeeded by 1926
