= Famiglia Vagabonda =

Italian-American crime syndicate

- Founded: 1908; 118 years ago
- Founder: Frank Piscioneri
- Founding location: Marion County, West Virginia, United States
- Years active: 1908–1923
- Territory: Harrison County, Jackson County, Roane County, Lincoln County
- Ethnicity: Italian
- Activities: Bootlegging, extortion, kidnapping, gambling, drug trafficking, prostitution, protection racketeering

The Famiglia Vagabonda ("Wandering Family") was an American Prohibition-era criminal organization of Italian origin operating in Clarksburg and Fairmont, West Virginia. The gang was composed of Black Handers, Camorristi and Mafiosi.

John C. McKinney, a detective who investigated the group, identified them as the "Famalia [sic] Vagabonda." At the time, local media simply identified the group as The Black Hand.

== History ==
The Famiglia Vagabonda first emerged in Marion County in 1908 as a group of Italian-born criminals under the leadership of Frank Pisconeri. The gang carried out a campaign of extortion in the Italian community and was also involved in gambling, narcotics trafficking, bootlegging, prostitution, kidnapping and murder. "Big Joe" Cenetti, leader of the Famiglia Vagabonda's Clarksburg faction, was shot dead in his automobile near Reynoldsville on December 28, 1921 as a result of an internecine conflict. In March 1923, Harrison County authorities arrested nine members in connection with twelve murders and series of dynamitings carried out in West Virginia, Pennsylvania and Maryland. Vincenzo "Jim" Urso, who led the Fairmont group, avoided prosecution as he had moved to Canada prior to the investigation. In early 1924, several members were executed for murder. Nicholas Salamante, Phillip Connizzaro and Richard Ferri were sentenced to be hanged on 4 January 1924. Approximately a month later, on 15 February, Samual Muratore was also executed. Another member, Pasquale "Patsy" Corbi, had been sentenced to life imprisonment in April 1923 for the January 16, 1922 murder of local barber Francesco "Frank Naples" Napolitano, a reputed Camorra member. Corbi's sentence was later commuted to eighteen years; he was paroled in 1932 and relocated to Baltimore, Maryland where he led a Calabrian mafia group that later became the Gambino crime family's Baltimore Crew.
