= List of people executed in the United States in 1934 =

One hundred and sixty-six people, one hundred and sixty-five male and one female, were executed in the United States in 1934, one hundred and thirty by electrocution, thirty by hanging, and six by gas chamber.

== List of people executed in the United States in 1934 ==
No.	Date of execution	Name	Age of person			Gender	Ethnicity	State	Method	Ref.
No.	Date of execution	Name	At execution	At offense	Age difference	Gender	Ethnicity	State	Method	Ref.
1	January 5, 1934	James Allen	21	19	2	Male	Black	Tennessee	Electrocution	
2	January 8, 1934	Frank Stabinski	22	21	1	Male	White	Pennsylvania	Electrocution	
3	January 8, 1934	Anthony P. Tetrosky	19	18	1	Male	White	Pennsylvania	Electrocution	
4	January 11, 1934	Herman Cunningham	23	22	1	Male	Black	New York	Electrocution	
5	January 11, 1934	Winston C. Owens	34	33	1	Male	Black	New York	Electrocution	
6	January 11, 1934	Joseph Willis	24	23	1	Male	Black	New York	Electrocution	
7	January 12, 1934	Ralph Edward Holmes	25	24	1	Male	Black	District of Columbia	Electrocution	
8	January 12, 1934	Joseph James Jackson	20	19	1	Male	Black	District of Columbia	Electrocution	
9	January 12, 1934	Irvin Murray	26	25	1	Male	Black	District of Columbia	Electrocution	
10	January 12, 1934	Will Osborne	19	Unknown	Unknown	Male	Black	Georgia	Electrocution	
11	January 18, 1934	Ira Kelly	38	37	1	Male	White	Texas	Electrocution	
12	January 23, 1934	Ahmed Osman	37	36	1	Male	Arab	Massachusetts	Electrocution	
13	January 24, 1934	William White	Unknown	Unknown	Unknown	Male	Black	Louisiana	Hanging	
14	February 2, 1934	Page Jupiter	46	45	1	Male	Black	Maryland	Hanging	
15	February 2, 1934	Thurman Ricks	26	Unknown	Unknown	Male	Black	Mississippi	Hanging	
16	February 2, 1934	Frank Flours	39	39	0	Male	Black	Texas	Electrocution	
17	February 5, 1934	Joseph Emory	39	37	2	Male	Black	Tennessee	Electrocution	
18	February 5, 1934	James Swann	20	18	2	Male	Black	Tennessee	Electrocution	
19	February 6, 1934	Albert Bruno	27	26	1	Male	White	Ohio	Electrocution	
20	February 9, 1934	Bennie Foster	21	20	1	Male	Black	Alabama	Electrocution	
21	February 9, 1934	Hardie White	32	Unknown	Unknown	Male	Black	Alabama	Electrocution	
22	February 9, 1934	John Thompson	38	Unknown	Unknown	Male	Black	Alabama	Electrocution	
23	February 9, 1934	Ernest Waller	21	Unknown	Unknown	Male	Black	Alabama	Electrocution	
24	February 9, 1934	Solomon Roper	24	22	2	Male	Black	Alabama	Electrocution	
25	February 9, 1934	Benjamin Butler	29	28	1	Male	Black	Arkansas	Electrocution	
26	February 9, 1934	Quang Shick	41	40	1	Male	Asian	California	Hanging	
27	February 9, 1934	Bluitt Burkley	19	19	0	Male	Black	Texas	Electrocution	
28	February 9, 1934	Thurman Burkley	18	17	1	Male	Black	Texas	Electrocution	
29	February 9, 1934	Jesse Mott	34	33	1	Male	Black	Texas	Electrocution	
30	February 22, 1934	Herman Snyder	21	18	3	Male	White	Massachusetts	Electrocution	
31	February 22, 1934	John A. Donnellon	24	21	3	Male	White	Massachusetts	Electrocution	
32	February 22, 1934	Henry Clay Bull	22	Unknown	Unknown	Male	White	Massachusetts	Electrocution	
33	February 26, 1934	Joseph Sterling	33	32	1	Male	Black	Pennsylvania	Electrocution	
34	February 26, 1934	Robert Harris	36	34	2	Male	Black	Pennsylvania	Electrocution	
35	February 26, 1934	Lewis Fain	28	26	2	Male	Black	Tennessee	Electrocution	
36	March 1, 1934	Lloyd Price	22	21	1	Male	Black	New York	Electrocution	
37	March 2, 1934	Homer Lee Short	24	Unknown	Unknown	Male	Black	Georgia	Electrocution	
38	March 2, 1934	Harley Wesley Edwards	39	38	1	Male	White	Indiana	Electrocution	
39	March 5, 1934	Wallace Skawinski	23	22	1	Male	White	Pennsylvania	Electrocution	
40	March 5, 1934	James Joseph Riggs	24	23	1	Male	White	Pennsylvania	Electrocution	
41	March 12, 1934	Robert Henry Wiles	49	49	0	Male	White	South Carolina	Electrocution	
42	March 16, 1934	John Downer	27	24	3	Male	Black	Georgia	Electrocution	
43	March 16, 1934	Sandy Walker	48	46	2	Male	Black	Georgia	Electrocution	
44	March 16, 1934	Isaac Howard	25	Unknown	Unknown	Male	Black	Mississippi	Hanging	
45	March 16, 1934	Ernest McGehee	23	Unknown	Unknown	Male	Black	Mississippi	Hanging	
46	March 16, 1934	Johnny Jones	23	Unknown	Unknown	Male	Black	Mississippi	Hanging	
47	March 16, 1934	Bob Owens	Unknown	Unknown	2	Male	Black	Mississippi	Hanging	
48	March 16, 1934	Jesse Brooks	46	45	1	Male	Black	North Carolina	Electrocution	
49	March 16, 1934	James Johnson	26	Unknown	Unknown	Male	Black	North Carolina	Electrocution	
50	March 23, 1934	Walter Thaxton	30	30	0	Male	Black	North Carolina	Electrocution	
51	March 26, 1934	Melroyal Burrell	34	Unknown	Unknown	Male	Black	New Jersey	Electrocution	
52	April 4, 1934	Jasper Graham	29	27	2	Male	Black	Tennessee	Electrocution	
53	April 4, 1934	Frank Mays	30	28	2	Male	Black	Tennessee	Electrocution	
54	April 4, 1934	Percy Smith	20	Unknown	Unknown	Male	Black	Tennessee	Electrocution	
55	April 6, 1934	Sack Jackson	27	Unknown	Unknown	Male	Black	Texas	Electrocution	
56	April 9, 1934	Richard C. Bach	23	22	1	Male	White	Pennsylvania	Electrocution	
57	April 13, 1934	John Watkins	24	24	0	Male	Black	South Carolina	Electrocution	
58	April 20, 1934	Miley Washington Lively	47	46	1	Male	White	Georgia	Electrocution	
59	April 20, 1934	John F. Scheck	21	20	1	Male	White	Illinois	Electrocution	
60	April 20, 1934	George Dale	28	27	1	Male	White	Illinois	Electrocution	
61	April 20, 1934	Joseph Francis	35	34	1	Male	Black	Illinois	Electrocution	
62	April 27, 1934	Ernest H. Bolden	25	23	2	Male	Black	District of Columbia	Electrocution	
63	April 27, 1934	Theodore Roosevelt Cooper	29	28	1	Male	Black	North Carolina	Electrocution	
64	April 27, 1934	John Ellis	18	18	0	Male	Black	South Carolina	Electrocution	
65	April 27, 1934	James Kinloch	20	20	0	Male	Black	South Carolina	Electrocution	
66	April 27, 1934	Charlie Outlaw	60	60	0	Male	White	Texas	Electrocution	
67	May 1, 1934	Johnnie Williams	29	26	3	Male	Black	Texas	Electrocution	
68	May 11, 1934	Luther Dean Jackson	25	23	2	Male	Black	Arkansas	Electrocution	
69	May 11, 1934	Mack James	29	28	1	Male	Black	Georgia	Electrocution	
70	May 11, 1934	Ted Bradley	25	23	2	Male	White	Washington	Hanging	
71	May 15, 1934	Hosea Patrick	30	Unknown	Unknown	Male	Black	Georgia	Electrocution	
72	May 15, 1934	Claude Harold Hicks	26	Unknown	Unknown	Male	Black	Georgia	Electrocution	
73	May 18, 1934	John F. Capaci	30	29	1	Male	White	Louisiana	Hanging	
74	May 18, 1934	George Dalleo	29	28	1	Male	White	Louisiana	Hanging	
75	May 18, 1934	Daniel Bryan Napier	38	38	0	Male	White	Louisiana	Hanging	
76	May 18, 1934	Mike Stefanoff	45	44	1	Male	White	North Carolina	Electrocution	
77	May 18, 1934	James Robert Sheffield	47	Unknown	Unknown	Male	White	North Carolina	Electrocution	
78	May 25, 1934	James Keaton	22	22	0	Male	Black	Mississippi	Hanging	
79	May 28, 1934	Charles Thomas Walker	31	29	2	Male	Black	Pennsylvania	Electrocution	
80	May 31, 1934	Pearlie Davis	25	24	1	Male	Black	Mississippi	Hanging	
81	June 1, 1934	Joe Goodman	38	37	1	Male	Black	District of Columbia	Electrocution	
82	June 1, 1934	George McKinley Pitmond	34	33	1	Male	Black	District of Columbia	Electrocution	
83	June 1, 1934	Nathan Brooks	29	28	1	Male	Black	Texas	Electrocution	
84	June 6, 1934	Eddie Lee	19	19	0	Male	Black	South Carolina	Electrocution	
85	June 6, 1934	Thomas Richardson	17	17	0	Male	Black	South Carolina	Electrocution	
86	June 7, 1934	Francis Pasqua	25	23	2	Male	White	New York	Electrocution	
87	June 7, 1934	Anthony Marino	28	27	1	Male	White	New York	Electrocution	
88	June 7, 1934	Daniel Kriesberg	29	28	1	Male	White	New York	Electrocution	
89	June 14, 1934	Ross Caccamise	24	23	1	Male	White	New York	Electrocution	
90	June 14, 1934	William Vogel	26	24	2	Male	White	New York	Electrocution	
91	June 15, 1934	Reese Castleberry Jr.	23	22	1	Male	Black	Georgia	Electrocution	
92	June 15, 1934	Floyd South	22	21	1	Male	Black	Georgia	Electrocution	
93	June 15, 1934	Ossie Smith	20	Unknown	Unknown	Male	Black	North Carolina	Electrocution	
94	June 22, 1934	William Cody Kelly	30	30	0	Male	White	Colorado	Gas chamber	
95	June 22, 1934	Joseph Lee Dalton	31	30	1	Male	White	North Carolina	Electrocution	
96	June 25, 1934	Irmel Kittrells	26	25	1	Male	Black	Ohio	Electrocution	
97	June 26, 1934	Warren Little	25	24	1	Male	White	Illinois	Electrocution	
98	June 29, 1934	George Williams	26	26	0	Male	Black	California	Hanging	
99	June 29, 1934	Paul H. Kauffman	34	30	4	Male	White	Missouri	Hanging	
100	July 5, 1934	Joseph Murphy	27	26	1	Male	White	New York	Electrocution	
101	July 6, 1934	Manuel Hernandez	18	17	1	Male	Hispanic	Arizona	Gas chamber	
102	July 6, 1934	Fernando Hernandez	19	18	1	Male	Hispanic	Arizona	Gas chamber	
103	July 6, 1934	Daniel Harris	37	36	1	Male	Black	California	Hanging	
104	July 6, 1934	John Mix	22	22	0	Male	Black	California	Hanging	
105	July 6, 1934	Clyde B. Ferrell	25	23	2	Male	White	North Carolina	Electrocution	
106	July 6, 1934	John Lewis Edwards	17	16	1	Male	Black	North Carolina	Electrocution	
107	July 12, 1934	Frank Canora	51	50	1	Male	White	New York	Electrocution	
108	July 13, 1934	George Joseph Shaughnessy	19	18	1	Male	White	Arizona	Gas chamber	
109	July 13, 1934	Jose Aragon	25	25	0	Male	Hispanic	California	Hanging	
110	July 13, 1934	Walker Rippy	24	24	0	Male	Black	California	Hanging	
111	July 13, 1934	Joseph Behiter	35	32	3	Male	Arab	Nevada	Gas chamber	
112	July 13, 1934	Payton G. Brown Sr.	22	22	0	Male	White	South Carolina	Electrocution	
113	July 20, 1934	Reuben Jones	18	18	0	Male	Black	South Carolina	Electrocution	
114	July 27, 1934	Willie Walton	25	22	3	Male	Black	Louisiana	Hanging	
115	August 9, 1934	Anna Antonio	29	26	3	Female	White	New York	Electrocution	
116	August 9, 1934	Sam Faraci	42	40	2	Male	White	New York	Electrocution	
117	August 9, 1934	Vincent Saeta	33	31	2	Male	White	New York	Electrocution	
118	August 24, 1934	Will Chaney	49	47	2	Male	Black	Kentucky	Electrocution	
119	August 24, 1934	George W. Tincher	37	35	2	Male	White	Kentucky	Electrocution	
120	August 31, 1934	Louis Sprague Douglas	47	45	2	Male	White	Arizona	Gas chamber	
121	August 31, 1934	Roosevelt Swain	Unknown	Unknown	Unknown	Male	Black	Louisiana	Hanging	
122	September 6, 1934	Alphonse Brengard	29	23	6	Male	White	New York	Electrocution	
123	September 14, 1934	Clifford Duncan	26	Unknown	Unknown	Male	Black	Georgia	Electrocution	
124	September 15, 1934	John Deal	31	30	1	Male	Black	Tennessee	Electrocution	
125	September 15, 1934	James Pillow	23	22	1	Male	Black	Tennessee	Electrocution	
126	September 21, 1934	George Keaton	28	26	2	Male	Black	North Carolina	Electrocution	
127	September 28, 1934	Louis Hamilton	28	25	3	Male	White	Indiana	Electrocution	
128	September 28, 1934	Emanuel Spice Bittings	42	41	1	Male	Black	North Carolina	Electrocution	
129	September 28, 1934	Willie J. Crockett	22	21	1	Male	Black	North Carolina	Electrocution	
130	September 28, 1934	Ed Stanton	45	43	2	Male	White	Texas	Electrocution	
131	October 1, 1934	Richard Perkins	34	31	3	Male	Black	Indiana	Electrocution	
132	October 3, 1934	Byron Miller	43	39	4	Male	White	Washington	Hanging	
133	October 5, 1934	Peter Alosi	42	42	0	Male	White	California	Hanging	
134	October 5, 1934	Frank Johnson	42	41	1	Male	Black	Georgia	Electrocution	
135	October 8, 1934	Walter Williams	31	31	0	Male	Black	Florida	Electrocution	
136	October 9, 1934	Edward Elijah Coffin	22	22	0	Male	White	Indiana	Electrocution	
137	October 12, 1934	Alonzo McNeil	29	29	0	Male	Black	Illinois	Electrocution	
138	October 12, 1934	George Walker	20	20	0	Male	Black	Illinois	Electrocution	
139	October 12, 1934	Eaver Pugh	24	24	0	Male	Black	South Carolina	Electrocution	
140	October 15, 1934	Edward H. Miller	29	28	1	Male	White	Ohio	Electrocution	
141	October 17, 1934	Harry L. Pierpont	32	30	2	Male	White	Ohio	Electrocution	
142	October 19, 1934	Levi Hicks	24	23	1	Male	Black	Louisiana	Hanging	
143	October 19, 1934	Frank Clark	60	60	0	Male	Black	Oklahoma	Electrocution	
144	November 2, 1934	Purcell Mitchell	21	21	0	Male	Black	Arkansas	Electrocution	
145	November 2, 1934	Mildrich Tinsley	46	45	1	Male	Black	Mississippi	Hanging	
146	November 15, 1934	Mose Street	29	28	1	Male	Black	Georgia	Electrocution	
147	November 16, 1934	Tom Johnson	26	25	1	Male	Black	North Carolina	Electrocution	
148	November 16, 1934	Preston Howard	19	18	1	Male	Black	North Carolina	Electrocution	
149	November 16, 1934	Johnny Hart	22	21	1	Male	Black	North Carolina	Electrocution	
150	November 19, 1934	Jack Jackson	36	36	0	Male	Black	Texas	Electrocution	
151	November 22, 1934	Herbert Thacker	21	20	1	Male	White	Ohio	Electrocution	
152	November 22, 1934	Ray Freeman	24	23	1	Male	White	Ohio	Electrocution	
153	November 23, 1934	Pat Nobles	46	43	3	Male	Black	California	Hanging	
154	November 23, 1934	Isaac Mosley	23	22	1	Male	Black	Ohio	Electrocution	
155	November 23, 1934	June Woolfolk	36	34	2	Male	Black	Texas	Electrocution	
156	November 30, 1934	Joe Cunningham	19	19	0	Male	Black	South Carolina	Electrocution	
157	December 6, 1934	Phil Williams	Unknown	Unknown	Unknown	Male	Black	Mississippi	Hanging	
158	December 7, 1934	Leo Dwight Murphy	41	33	8	Male	White	California	Hanging	
159	December 7, 1934	Francis Harold Glenday	29	27	2	Male	White	Kentucky	Electrocution	
160	December 7, 1934	Bascom G. Greene	44	43	1	Male	White	North Carolina	Electrocution	
161	December 7, 1934	James Lester Greene	22	21	1	Male	White	North Carolina	Electrocution	
162	December 7, 1934	Robert Edward Black	25	24	1	Male	White	North Carolina	Electrocution	
163	December 12, 1934	Obediah McKnight	48	47	1	Male	Black	Mississippi	Hanging	
164	December 14, 1934	Rufus Prince Satterfield	44	43	1	Male	White	North Carolina	Electrocution	
165	December 15, 1934	Herman Boulan	39	39	0	Male	Hispanic	Illinois	Electrocution	
166	December 15, 1934	Walter Dittman	27	27	0	Male	White	Illinois	Electrocution	

== Demographics ==
Gender
Male	165	99%
Female	1	1%
Ethnicity
Black	101	61%
White	58	35%
Hispanic	4	2%
Arab	2	1%
Asian	1	1%
State
North Carolina	20	12%
New York	15	9%
Georgia	13	8%
Texas	12	7%
Mississippi	10	6%
South Carolina	10	6%
California	9	5%
Tennessee	9	5%
Illinois	8	5%
Pennsylvania	8	5%
Louisiana	7	4%
Ohio	7	4%
District of Columbia	6	4%
Alabama	5	3%
Arizona	4	2%
Indiana	4	2%
Massachusetts	4	2%
Arkansas	3	2%
Kentucky	3	2%
Washington	2	1%
Colorado	1	1%
Florida	1	1%
Maryland	1	1%
Missouri	1	1%
Nevada	1	1%
New Jersey	1	1%
Oklahoma	1	1%
Method
Electrocution	130	78%
Hanging	30	18%
Gas chamber	6	4%
Month
January	13	8%
February	22	13%
March	16	10%
April	15	9%
May	14	8%
June	19	11%
July	15	9%
August	7	4%
September	9	5%
October	13	8%
November	13	8%
December	10	6%
Age
Unknown	4	2%
10–19	14	8%
20–29	88	53%
30–39	35	21%
40–49	22	13%
50–59	1	1%
60–69	2	1%
Total	166	100%

== Executions in recent years ==
Number of executions
1935	198
1934	166
1933	162
Total	526

Preceded by 1933	List of people executed in the United States in 1934	Succeeded by 1935
