= List of people executed in the United States in 1935 =

One hundred and ninety-eight people, one hundred and ninety-five male and three female, were executed in the United States in 1935, one hundred and fifty by electrocution, forty-five by hanging, and three by gas chamber.

== List of people executed in the United States in 1935 ==
No.	Date of execution	Name	Age of person			Gender	Ethnicity	State	Method	Ref.
No.	Date of execution	Name	At execution	At offense	Age difference	Gender	Ethnicity	State	Method	Ref.
1	January 4, 1935	Hampton Pannell	37	25	12	Male	Black	Ohio	Electrocution	
2	January 4, 1935	Ernest Oglesby	27	26	1	Male	White	Oklahoma	Electrocution	
3	January 4, 1935	Clarence Floyd	20	19	1	Male	Black	South Carolina	Electrocution	
4	January 7, 1935	Greely Blankenship	29	29	0	Male	White	West Virginia	Hanging	
5	January 10, 1935	Harold Seaman	21	20	1	Male	White	New York	Electrocution	
6	January 10, 1935	Vincent Walsh	21	19	2	Male	White	New York	Electrocution	
7	January 11, 1935	Mike Lami	39	38	1	Male	Arab	California	Hanging	
8	January 17, 1935	Frank Mitchell	26	25	1	Male	White	New York	Electrocution	
9	January 21, 1935	Charlie Dodson	17	17	0	Male	Black	Georgia	Electrocution	
10	January 22, 1935	Fred Anderson	24	23	1	Male	Black	Florida	Electrocution	
11	January 22, 1935	Thomas Jefferson	23	23	0	Male	Black	Florida	Electrocution	
12	January 24, 1935	Giuseppe Leonti	43	41	2	Male	White	New York	Electrocution	
13	January 25, 1935	Eulogio B. Sisson	30	28	2	Male	Asian	California	Hanging	
14	January 25, 1935	LaRoy Lane	24	24	0	Male	White	Texas	Electrocution	
15	February 1, 1935	Harold Peter Bieber	41	41	0	Male	White	California	Hanging	
16	February 1, 1935	Louis Kenneth Neu	27	25	2	Male	White	Louisiana	Hanging	
17	February 1, 1935	Carl Bill Dobbins	33	32	1	Male	White	Texas	Electrocution	
18	February 2, 1935	Robert Howard Mais	29	28	1	Male	White	Virginia	Electrocution	
19	February 2, 1935	Walter Legenza	40	39	1	Male	White	Virginia	Electrocution	
20	February 7, 1935	William Paskowitz	24	22	2	Male	White	New York	Electrocution	
21	February 7, 1935	Peter Crotty	28	26	2	Male	White	New York	Electrocution	
22	February 7, 1935	Alfred Giallarenzi	31	29	2	Male	White	New York	Electrocution	
23	February 8, 1935	James Sydney Rogan	36	33	3	Male	White	California	Hanging	
24	February 8, 1935	Cleve Cooper	38	37	1	Male	Black	Louisiana	Hanging	
25	February 8, 1935	Ed Dunn	Unknown	Unknown	Unknown	Male	Black	Louisiana	Hanging	
26	February 8, 1935	Julia Moore	Unknown	Unknown	Unknown	Female	Black	Louisiana	Hanging	
27	February 11, 1935	John Thomas Hammett	47	45	2	Male	White	Georgia	Electrocution	
28	February 15, 1935	Edward Anderson	25	24	1	Male	White	California	Hanging	
29	February 15, 1935	Archie Barfield	22	21	1	Male	Black	Georgia	Electrocution	
30	February 15, 1935	Leonard Burns	41	39	2	Male	White	Texas	Electrocution	
31	February 19, 1935	Alexander Kaminski	25	23	2	Male	White	Massachusetts	Electrocution	
32	February 21, 1935	Vincent DeLeo	29	28	1	Male	White	New York	Electrocution	
33	February 22, 1935	Wiley Graves	29	28	1	Male	Black	Kentucky	Electrocution	
34	February 23, 1935	Robert Rose	24	24	0	Male	White	Arkansas	Electrocution	
35	February 25, 1935	George Robinson	46	Unknown	Unknown	Male	Black	Florida	Electrocution	
36	March 1, 1935	Ed Thomas	Unknown	Unknown	2	Male	Black	Alabama	Electrocution	
37	March 1, 1935	Frank Barnes	50	49	1	Male	White	Arkansas	Electrocution	
38	March 1, 1935	Rack Reese	55	54	1	Male	Black	Georgia	Electrocution	
39	March 1, 1935	John Henry Wright	28	27	1	Male	Black	Georgia	Electrocution	
40	March 1, 1935	Charlie Williams	27	25	2	Male	Black	Kentucky	Electrocution	
41	March 5, 1935	Joseph Tucker	29	28	1	Male	Black	Georgia	Electrocution	
42	March 5, 1935	Alonzo Robinson	40	39	1	Male	Black	Mississippi	Hanging	
43	March 7, 1935	Daniel W. Brown	Unknown	Unknown	0	Male	Black	Georgia	Electrocution	
44	March 7, 1935	Arthur Bell	Unknown	Unknown	0	Male	Black	Georgia	Electrocution	
45	March 8, 1935	Mark Harry Shank	43	41	2	Male	White	Arkansas	Electrocution	
46	March 11, 1935	Phillip Jones	26	26	0	Male	Black	Virginia	Electrocution	
47	March 15, 1935	Robert Franklin Hargroves	27	25	2	Male	White	Georgia	Electrocution	
48	March 15, 1935	Sidney Etheridge	44	43	1	Male	White	North Carolina	Electrocution	
49	March 15, 1935	Connie Scarpone	26	24	2	Male	White	New Jersey	Electrocution	
50	March 15, 1935	Michael Mule	25	23	2	Male	White	New Jersey	Electrocution	
51	March 15, 1935	George DeStefano Jr.	25	23	2	Male	White	New Jersey	Electrocution	
52	March 19, 1935	Gabe Smith Jr.	24	23	1	Male	Black	Texas	Electrocution	
53	March 21, 1935	Chester Novak	30	29	1	Male	White	Illinois	Electrocution	
54	March 22, 1935	Blake Ruff	23	Unknown	Unknown	Male	Black	Alabama	Electrocution	
55	March 22, 1935	Kurt Barth	23	22	1	Male	White	New Jersey	Electrocution	
56	March 29, 1935	Victor Pierce	35	34	1	Male	White	Georgia	Electrocution	
57	April 2, 1935	Ira Rector	21	20	1	Male	Black	Texas	Electrocution	
58	April 5, 1935	Rush Griffin	19	18	1	Male	Black	California	Hanging	
59	April 5, 1935	Herman Smith	35	34	1	Male	White	Florida	Electrocution	
60	April 5, 1935	Isiah Ashley	17	16	1	Male	Black	Georgia	Electrocution	
61	April 5, 1935	Albert Rivers	41	Unknown	Unknown	Male	Black	Georgia	Electrocution	
62	April 8, 1935	William Talarico	23	22	1	Male	White	Pennsylvania	Electrocution	
63	April 8, 1935	Walter Mika	23	22	1	Male	White	Pennsylvania	Electrocution	
64	April 9, 1935	William Wright	39	38	1	Male	Black	Ohio	Electrocution	
65	April 11, 1935	Martin F. Jarvis	36	34	2	Male	White	Florida	Electrocution	
66	April 12, 1935	John C. Morgan	44	Unknown	Unknown	Male	White	Delaware	Hanging	
67	April 12, 1935	Frank Sonny McDaniel	30	28	2	Male	Black	Missouri	Hanging	
68	April 12, 1935	William A. Roland	45	44	1	Male	Black	Missouri	Hanging	
69	April 19, 1935	William Thomas DeBoe Jr.	22	21	1	Male	White	Kentucky	Hanging	
70	April 19, 1935	James A. Gross	25	Unknown	Unknown	Male	Black	Maryland	Hanging	
71	April 19, 1935	Gordon Dent	30	Unknown	Unknown	Male	Black	Maryland	Hanging	
72	April 19, 1935	Doye L. Arnold	27	25	2	Male	White	Texas	Electrocution	
73	April 23, 1935	Thomas J. Lehne	42	41	1	Male	White	Illinois	Electrocution	
74	April 23, 1935	Frederikus Blink	43	43	0	Male	White	Illinois	Electrocution	
75	April 24, 1935	Henry John Zorn	26	25	1	Male	White	Montana	Hanging	
76	April 25, 1935	Stanley Pluzdrak	18	17	1	Male	White	New York	Electrocution	
77	April 25, 1935	Bruno Salek	20	20	0	Male	White	New York	Electrocution	
78	May 6, 1935	Robert Allen Edwards	22	21	1	Male	White	Pennsylvania	Electrocution	
79	May 10, 1935	Henry Harden	24	23	1	Male	Black	Georgia	Electrocution	
80	May 10, 1935	Charlie Stone	30	Unknown	Unknown	Male	Black	Georgia	Electrocution	
81	May 10, 1935	Fred Gerner	27	27	0	Male	White	Illinois	Electrocution	
82	May 10, 1935	John Hauff	32	32	0	Male	White	Illinois	Electrocution	
83	May 10, 1935	Arthur John Thielen	41	41	0	Male	White	Illinois	Electrocution	
84	May 10, 1935	Raymond Elzie Hamilton	20	19	1	Male	White	Texas	Electrocution	
85	May 10, 1935	Joseph Conger Palmer	32	31	1	Male	White	Texas	Electrocution	
86	May 24, 1935	Tellie McQuate	44	43	1	Male	White	California	Hanging	
87	May 24, 1935	James Smith	30	Unknown	Unknown	Male	Black	Kentucky	Electrocution	
88	May 24, 1935	Robert Cargo	21	20	1	Male	White	Oklahoma	Electrocution	
89	May 24, 1935	Curtis Williams	23	23	0	Male	Black	South Carolina	Electrocution	
90	May 31, 1935	Anastacio Bermijo	38	36	2	Male	Asian	California	Hanging	
91	May 31, 1935	John D. Pacheco	26	24	2	Male	Hispanic	Colorado	Gas chamber	
92	May 31, 1935	Louis Pacheco	38	37	1	Male	Hispanic	Colorado	Gas chamber	
93	June 1, 1935	Peter D. Treadway	39	36	3	Male	White	Ohio	Electrocution	
94	June 5, 1935	Patrick William Griffin	37	34	3	Male	White	Iowa	Hanging	
95	June 5, 1935	Elmer Floyd Brewer	40	38	2	Male	White	Iowa	Hanging	
96	June 7, 1935	Edward L. Lang	26	25	1	Male	White	California	Hanging	
97	June 7, 1935	May Howard Carey	55	48	7	Female	White	Delaware	Hanging	
98	June 7, 1935	Howard Jacob Carey Sr.	27	20	7	Male	White	Delaware	Hanging	
99	June 7, 1935	Feltus Matthews	21	21	0	Male	Black	Louisiana	Hanging	
100	June 7, 1935	Abraham Morris Faber	25	24	1	Male	White	Massachusetts	Electrocution	
101	June 7, 1935	Irving Edwin Millen	22	20	2	Male	White	Massachusetts	Electrocution	
102	June 7, 1935	Murton Myer Millen	25	24	1	Male	White	Massachusetts	Electrocution	
103	June 7, 1935	Thurmond Harris	24	24	0	Male	Black	South Carolina	Electrocution	
104	June 7, 1935	Albert Carr	27	26	1	Male	Black	Texas	Electrocution	
105	June 12, 1935	Elijah H. Stewart	28	27	1	Male	White	Texas	Electrocution	
106	June 12, 1935	John B. Willis	42	41	1	Male	White	Texas	Electrocution	
107	June 14, 1935	Charlie Beasley	50	50	0	Male	Black	Georgia	Electrocution	
108	June 14, 1935	Robert C. Mullinax	34	33	1	Male	White	Georgia	Electrocution	
109	June 14, 1935	Olivett Griggs	32	31	1	Male	Black	Indiana	Electrocution	
110	June 21, 1935	Aldrich Welsford Lutz	19	19	0	Male	White	California	Hanging	
111	June 21, 1935	Leonard Belongia	24	23	1	Male	White	Colorado	Gas chamber	
112	June 27, 1935	Eva Coo	46	44	2	Female	White	New York	Electrocution	
113	June 27, 1935	Leonard Scarnici	27	25	2	Male	White	New York	Electrocution	
114	June 28, 1935	Bill Young	23	22	1	Male	White	Kentucky	Electrocution	
115	June 28, 1935	Carl Lee Dotson	Unknown	Unknown	Unknown	Male	Black	Louisiana	Hanging	
116	June 28, 1935	William Harold	43	42	1	Male	Black	Maryland	Hanging	
117	June 28, 1935	James Poindexter	27	26	1	Male	Black	Maryland	Hanging	
118	July 3, 1935	William Deni	34	33	1	Male	White	Pennsylvania	Electrocution	
119	July 9, 1935	John Krul	23	23	0	Male	White	Illinois	Electrocution	
120	July 9, 1935	Edward Balling	19	19	0	Male	White	Illinois	Electrocution	
121	July 9, 1935	Van Buren Dedmon	25	25	0	Male	White	Illinois	Electrocution	
122	July 10, 1935	Harry Garcia	33	31	2	Male	Hispanic	California	Hanging	
123	July 11, 1935	Patrick N. Downey	31	30	1	Male	White	New York	Electrocution	
124	July 12, 1935	Cleveland Hicks	30	30	0	Male	Black	Georgia	Electrocution	
125	July 12, 1935	Lewis C. Sentell	39	Unknown	Unknown	Male	White	North Carolina	Electrocution	
126	July 12, 1935	George Whitfield	23	21	2	Male	Black	North Carolina	Electrocution	
127	July 12, 1935	Lewis Cernoch	41	39	2	Male	White	Texas	Electrocution	
128	July 19, 1935	J.B. Reece	19	19	0	Male	Black	Georgia	Electrocution	
129	July 19, 1935	Hong Yick	39	38	1	Male	Asian	Washington	Hanging	
130	July 19, 1935	Robert Branch	39	Unknown	Unknown	Male	Black	West Virginia	Hanging	
131	July 22, 1935	Russell C. Swiger	22	21	1	Male	White	Ohio	Electrocution	
132	July 22, 1935	Sherman Leroy Strawser	29	29	0	Male	White	Pennsylvania	Electrocution	
133	July 26, 1935	Ransome Emanuel	65	Unknown	Unknown	Male	Black	South Carolina	Electrocution	
134	July 26, 1935	Monroe Stewart	22	Unknown	Unknown	Male	Black	South Carolina	Electrocution	
135	August 2, 1935	Oliver Buckler	35	Unknown	Unknown	Male	Black	Mississippi	Hanging	
136	August 2, 1935	Dortch Waller	43	42	1	Male	Black	North Carolina	Electrocution	
137	August 2, 1935	William Taft Williams	Unknown	Unknown	1	Male	Black	North Carolina	Electrocution	
138	August 9, 1935	Houston McMillen	25	24	1	Male	Black	North Carolina	Electrocution	
139	August 9, 1935	Vander Glover	30	29	1	Male	Black	North Carolina	Electrocution	
140	August 9, 1935	Roy Smith	34	33	1	Male	White	Ohio	Electrocution	
141	August 14, 1935	John Trapper	50	50	0	Male	Black	Texas	Electrocution	
142	August 16, 1935	Augustin Ramos	32	31	1	Male	Asian	California	Hanging	
143	August 16, 1935	D.M. Blanden	19	18	1	Male	Black	South Carolina	Electrocution	
144	August 16, 1935	Johnnie Dade	22	21	1	Male	Black	Texas	Electrocution	
145	August 23, 1935	Tom Freeman	28	Unknown	Unknown	Male	Black	Arkansas	Electrocution	
146	August 23, 1935	Bernard Edmund LaCoume	24	22	2	Male	White	Texas	Electrocution	
147	August 29, 1935	Alfred J. Lindsay	29	29	0	Male	White	New York	Electrocution	
148	August 30, 1935	Edwin David Gayman	44	42	2	Male	White	Missouri	Hanging	
149	August 30, 1935	Roy E. Hamilton	26	24	2	Male	White	Missouri	Hanging	
150	August 30, 1935	Ben Boyd	24	23	1	Male	Black	Texas	Electrocution	
151	September 6, 1935	William Bagley	43	42	1	Male	White	California	Hanging	
152	September 6, 1935	Ethan Allen McNabb	37	36	1	Male	White	California	Hanging	
153	September 6, 1935	Caesar Miller	18	Unknown	Unknown	Male	Black	North Carolina	Electrocution	
154	September 6, 1935	William David May Sr.	38	36	2	Male	White	Texas	Electrocution	
155	September 9, 1935	Dominick Iacobino	50	49	1	Male	White	Pennsylvania	Electrocution	
156	September 16, 1935	Monroe Hasty	18	17	1	Male	Black	Florida	Electrocution	
157	September 20, 1935	Chester L. Barrett	37	36	1	Male	White	Oklahoma	Electrocution	
158	September 20, 1935	Bun Riley	29	28	1	Male	White	Oklahoma	Electrocution	
159	September 20, 1935	Alfred Rowan	30	Unknown	Unknown	Male	Black	Oklahoma	Electrocution	
160	September 27, 1935	Willard Walters	23	23	0	Male	Black	Ohio	Electrocution	
161	September 28, 1935	Bill Barnes	21	20	1	Male	White	Arkansas	Electrocution	
162	September 28, 1935	Paul Nelson	23	22	1	Male	White	Arkansas	Electrocution	
163	September 30, 1935	John William Koziar	33	32	1	Male	White	Pennsylvania	Electrocution	
164	October 4, 1935	Robert Thomas	23	22	1	Male	White	North Carolina	Electrocution	
165	October 4, 1935	Ories Gunter	20	20	0	Male	White	North Carolina	Electrocution	
166	October 4, 1935	Arthur Gosnell	21	21	0	Male	White	North Carolina	Electrocution	
167	October 10, 1935	Simmie Gaines	35	Unknown	Unknown	Male	Black	Georgia	Electrocution	
168	October 15, 1935	Gerald T. Thompson	25	25	0	Male	White	Illinois	Electrocution	
169	October 15, 1935	John Favorito	26	Unknown	Unknown	Male	White	New Jersey	Electrocution	
170	October 16, 1935	George Griner	38	38	0	Male	Black	Montana	Hanging	
171	October 17, 1935	George Davis	24	23	1	Male	Black	Ohio	Electrocution	
172	October 18, 1935	George P. McRae	24	23	1	Male	White	Georgia	Electrocution	
173	October 19, 1935	Richard Chapman	21	20	1	Male	White	Indiana	Electrocution	
174	October 23, 1935	Theodore Blackman	20	19	1	Male	Black	Ohio	Electrocution	
175	October 24, 1935	John Hawkins	25	24	1	Male	White	California	Hanging	
176	November 1, 1935	Frank Napoleon Dobbs	36	35	1	Male	White	Arkansas	Electrocution	
177	November 1, 1935	Ethol B. Lamphier	45	45	0	Male	White	Ohio	Electrocution	
178	November 22, 1935	Jack Mattox	26	Unknown	Unknown	Male	Black	Georgia	Electrocution	
179	November 25, 1935	William Robert Hildreth	49	48	1	Male	White	Texas	Electrocution	
180	November 29, 1935	Reginald Seymour Tracy	54	53	1	Male	White	Iowa	Hanging	
181	December 2, 1935	Martin Edmund Farrell	28	27	1	Male	White	Pennsylvania	Electrocution	
182	December 2, 1935	Francis Royal Wiley	27	26	1	Male	White	Pennsylvania	Electrocution	
183	December 5, 1935	Percy Morris	29	28	1	Male	Black	New York	Electrocution	
184	December 5, 1935	Jeff Brown	22	21	1	Male	Black	New York	Electrocution	
185	December 6, 1935	Ellis J. Latona	43	41	2	Male	White	California	Hanging	
186	December 6, 1935	Eulie Lotheridge	26	22	4	Male	White	Kentucky	Electrocution	
187	December 6, 1935	Pierson Cantrell	39	37	2	Male	White	Texas	Electrocution	
188	December 9, 1935	John Davis Jordan	34	33	1	Male	White	Pennsylvania	Electrocution	
189	December 13, 1935	Ben Hawkins	37	37	0	Male	Black	Arkansas	Electrocution	
190	December 13, 1935	Mack Nelson	23	23	0	Male	Black	Arkansas	Electrocution	
191	December 13, 1935	Arthur D. West	33	32	1	Male	White	California	Hanging	
192	December 17, 1935	Jesse H. Thompson	67	67	0	Male	Black	Ohio	Electrocution	
193	December 20, 1935	Marvin A. Honea	29	28	1	Male	White	Georgia	Electrocution	
194	December 20, 1935	John Will White	24	24	0	Male	Black	Georgia	Electrocution	
195	December 20, 1935	Harry Hill	Unknown	Unknown	1	Male	Black	South Carolina	Electrocution	
196	December 20, 1935	Cornell Luster	30	29	1	Male	Black	South Carolina	Electrocution	
197	December 30, 1935	Romaine Johnson	33	32	1	Male	Black	New Jersey	Electrocution	
198	December 31, 1935	C.B. James	32	Unknown	Unknown	Male	White	Texas	Electrocution	

== Demographics ==
Gender
Male	195	98%
Female	3	2%
Ethnicity
White	113	57%
Black	77	39%
Asian	4	2%
Hispanic	3	2%
Arab	1	1%
State
Georgia	23	12%
Texas	20	10%
California	17	9%
New York	16	8%
North Carolina	11	6%
Illinois	10	5%
Ohio	10	5%
Pennsylvania	10	5%
Arkansas	9	5%
South Carolina	8	4%
Florida	6	3%
Kentucky	6	3%
Louisiana	6	3%
New Jersey	6	3%
Oklahoma	5	3%
Maryland	4	2%
Massachusetts	4	2%
Missouri	4	2%
Colorado	3	2%
Delaware	3	2%
Iowa	3	2%
Virginia	3	2%
Alabama	2	1%
Indiana	2	1%
Mississippi	2	1%
Montana	2	1%
West Virginia	2	1%
Washington	1	1%
Method
Electrocution	150	76%
Hanging	45	23%
Gas chamber	3	2%
Month
January	14	7%
February	21	11%
March	21	11%
April	21	11%
May	15	8%
June	25	13%
July	17	9%
August	16	8%
September	13	7%
October	12	6%
November	5	3%
December	18	9%
Age
Unknown	8	4%
10–19	10	5%
20–29	94	47%
30–39	50	25%
40–49	27	14%
50–59	7	4%
60–69	2	1%
Total	198	100%

== Executions in recent years ==
Number of executions
1936	196
1935	198
1934	166
Total	560

Preceded by 1934	List of people executed in the United States in 1935	Succeeded by 1936
