= List of people executed in the United States in 1938 =

One hundred and eighty-eight people, one hundred and eighty-six male and two female, were executed in the United States in 1938, one hundred and twenty-two by electrocution, thirty-three by hanging, thirty-two by gas chamber, and one by firing squad.

Pennsylvania executed three white men for the murder of a black man.

== List of people executed in the United States in 1938 ==
No.	Date of execution	Name	Age of person			Gender	Ethnicity	State	Method	Ref.
No.	Date of execution	Name	At execution	At offense	Age difference	Gender	Ethnicity	State	Method	Ref.
1	January 6, 1938	Salvatore Ossido	27	26	1	Male	White	New York	Electrocution	
2	January 7, 1938	Frank Wilhelm	24	23	1	Male	Asian	California	Hanging	
3	January 14, 1938	Elvin Jack Odom	27	26	1	Male	White	Arizona	Gas chamber	
4	January 14, 1938	Willis Fuller	28	27	1	Male	White	Indiana	Electrocution	
5	January 14, 1938	Albert Lee Hemphill	23	22	1	Male	Black	Texas	Electrocution	
6	January 15, 1938	Owen J. Cauche	29	22	7	Male	White	Louisiana	Hanging	
7	January 15, 1938	Anthony Dallao	33	26	7	Male	White	Louisiana	Hanging	
8	January 15, 1938	Joseph Ugarte	27	20	7	Male	White	Louisiana	Hanging	
9	January 15, 1938	Franklin Robideau	49	49	0	Male	White	Montana	Hanging	
10	January 17, 1938	William McKinley Gardner	37	34	3	Male	White	Ohio	Electrocution	
11	January 17, 1938	Charles J. Hines	26	25	1	Male	White	Ohio	Electrocution	
12	January 18, 1938	Anthony DiStasio	26	24	2	Male	White	Massachusetts	Electrocution	
13	January 18, 1938	Frank DiStasio	52	50	2	Male	White	Massachusetts	Electrocution	
14	January 21, 1938	James Sermons	29	Unknown	Unknown	Male	Black	North Carolina	Gas chamber	
15	January 21, 1938	Ramon A. Cota	35	34	1	Male	White	New Jersey	Electrocution	
16	January 24, 1938	John Milton Mercer	29	21	8	Male	White	Iowa	Hanging	
17	January 24, 1938	Allen Baldwin Wheaton	21	20	1	Male	White	Iowa	Hanging	
18	January 28, 1938	Frank Millhouse	18	15	3	Male	Black	Alabama	Electrocution	
19	January 28, 1938	R. P. Vaughn	20	17	3	Male	Black	Alabama	Electrocution	
20	January 28, 1938	Angelo Ralph Giancola	22	21	1	Male	White	Illinois	Electrocution	
21	January 28, 1938	Marie Porter	38	37	1	Female	White	Illinois	Electrocution	
22	February 4, 1938	Duncan Pigue	27	Unknown	Unknown	Male	Black	Arkansas	Electrocution	
23	February 4, 1938	James Marshall	30	Unknown	Unknown	Male	Black	North Carolina	Gas chamber	
24	February 7, 1938	Walter Strantz	37	36	1	Male	White	Pennsylvania	Electrocution	
25	February 8, 1938	William John Stephan	31	29	2	Male	White	New Jersey	Electrocution	
26	February 18, 1938	Roy Leon Righthouse	28	27	1	Male	White	California	Hanging	
27	February 18, 1938	Lee Goodwin	28	Unknown	Unknown	Male	White	California	Hanging	
28	February 18, 1938	Milford Harris Exum	40	38	2	Male	White	North Carolina	Gas chamber	
29	February 18, 1938	Edgar Leroy Smoak Sr.	40	37	3	Male	White	North Carolina	Gas chamber	
30	February 23, 1938	Clifford Hawkins	25	24	1	Male	White	Washington	Hanging	
31	February 24, 1938	Charles James Brown	30	29	1	Male	Black	New York	Electrocution	
32	February 25, 1938	Leroy Ware	19	Unknown	Unknown	Male	Black	Arkansas	Electrocution	
33	February 25, 1938	Claud Henry Ryan	34	33	1	Male	White	Washington	Hanging	
34	March 4, 1938	John Brown	35	33	2	Male	Black	Missouri	Gas chamber	
35	March 4, 1938	William Wright	32	27	5	Male	Black	Missouri	Gas chamber	
36	March 5, 1938	Raymond Boyer	33	31	2	Male	White	Missouri	Gas chamber	
37	March 11, 1938	Willie Noble	25	24	1	Male	Black	Arkansas	Electrocution	
38	March 15, 1938	Leroy Kelley	33	32	1	Male	Black	Texas	Electrocution	
39	March 18, 1938	Lester Warfel Brockelhurst Jr.	24	23	1	Male	White	Arkansas	Electrocution	
40	March 18, 1938	Joe Newt Sims	30	29	1	Male	White	Arkansas	Electrocution	
41	March 18, 1938	Norman Wesley Robinson	29	27	2	Male	Black	District of Columbia	Electrocution	
42	March 21, 1938	Martin Joseph Sullivan	71	70	1	Male	White	Pennsylvania	Electrocution	
43	March 21, 1938	Orville Adkins	25	25	0	Male	White	West Virginia	Hanging	
44	March 21, 1938	John Travis	25	24	1	Male	White	West Virginia	Hanging	
45	March 21, 1938	Arnett Allen Booth	47	47	0	Male	White	West Virginia	Hanging	
46	March 22, 1938	Doran Roach	27	26	1	Male	Black	New Jersey	Electrocution	
47	March 25, 1938	Everett Jones	33	32	1	Male	White	Ohio	Electrocution	
48	March 25, 1938	James Jackson	28	26	2	Male	Black	Virginia	Electrocution	
49	March 25, 1938	Jasper McNeill	24	24	0	Male	Black	Virginia	Electrocution	
50	March 28, 1938	Ralph E. Hawk	21	20	1	Male	White	Pennsylvania	Electrocution	
51	March 28, 1938	Fred Reibaldi	27	26	1	Male	White	Pennsylvania	Electrocution	
52	March 28, 1938	Albert Gregg	32	32	0	Male	White	Pennsylvania	Electrocution	
53	March 31, 1938	Virgil Terrill	25	24	1	Male	Black	Texas	Electrocution	
54	April 1, 1938	Albert Faria	31	30	1	Male	White	New Jersey	Electrocution	
55	April 1, 1938	Harry Peter Simmons	27	26	1	Male	Native American	New Jersey	Electrocution	
56	April 8, 1938	Joe Martin	31	Unknown	Unknown	Male	Black	Virginia	Electrocution	
57	April 12, 1938	Frank Palko	25	22	3	Male	White	Connecticut	Electrocution	
58	April 13, 1938	Earnest Gaines	25	25	0	Male	Black	South Carolina	Electrocution	
59	April 15, 1938	Gus McKinney	19	18	1	Male	Black	Tennessee	Electrocution	
60	April 19, 1938	Marlo Marcus Heinz	32	29	3	Male	White	Iowa	Hanging	
61	April 19, 1938	Franz A. Jacobsen	30	28	2	Male	White	Iowa	Hanging	
62	April 19, 1938	J. C. Scott	22	22	0	Male	Black	Illinois	Electrocution	
63	April 25, 1938	Edward Rose	22	20	2	Male	White	Pennsylvania	Electrocution	
64	April 25, 1938	Theodore Duminiak	20	18	2	Male	White	Pennsylvania	Electrocution	
65	April 25, 1938	John Oreszak	20	18	2	Male	White	Pennsylvania	Electrocution	
66	April 29, 1938	Waddell Hadley	22	Unknown	Unknown	Male	Black	North Carolina	Gas chamber	
67	April 29, 1938	Sylvester Outlaw	32	31	1	Male	Black	North Carolina	Gas chamber	
68	April 29, 1938	Benjamin Rivers	46	44	2	Male	Black	South Carolina	Electrocution	
69	April 29, 1938	Johnnie Banks	25	23	2	Male	Black	Texas	Electrocution	
70	April 30, 1938	John Walker Vaughn	32	31	1	Male	White	Texas	Electrocution	
71	May 3, 1938	Monroe White	33	32	1	Male	Black	Indiana	Electrocution	
72	May 6, 1938	Archie Haywood	37	36	1	Male	Black	Georgia	Electrocution	
73	May 6, 1938	Heber Luther Hicks	40	38	2	Male	White	Indiana	Electrocution	
74	May 6, 1938	Henderson Young	15	15	0	Male	Black	Texas	Electrocution	
75	May 6, 1938	Roscoe Young	17	16	1	Male	Black	Texas	Electrocution	
76	May 10, 1938	Paul Layes	34	32	2	Male	White	Texas	Electrocution	
77	May 13, 1938	George Thomas	21	21	0	Male	Black	Georgia	Electrocution	
78	May 13, 1938	Edward Philip Simpson	40	39	1	Male	White	Massachusetts	Electrocution	
79	May 13, 1938	Raymond Styers	29	27	2	Male	White	West Virginia	Hanging	
80	May 20, 1938	Troy Triplett	23	22	1	Male	White	Kentucky	Electrocution	
81	May 20, 1938	Ollie Armstrong	Unknown	Unknown	Unknown	Male	Black	Mississippi	Hanging	
82	May 20, 1938	Alvin Taylor	Unknown	Unknown	Unknown	Male	Black	Mississippi	Hanging	
83	May 26, 1938	Terrence Roberts	26	25	1	Male	White	New York	Electrocution	
84	May 31, 1938	Charlie Brooks	41	39	2	Male	Black	Texas	Electrocution	
85	June 1, 1938	John Dee Smith	22	19	3	Male	White	Indiana	Electrocution	
86	June 2, 1938	Lawrence Marks	50	49	1	Male	White	New York	Electrocution	
87	June 3, 1938	Harold Van Venison	30	30	0	Male	Black	Kentucky	Hanging	
88	June 3, 1938	Tonnie Moore	26	25	1	Male	Black	Texas	Electrocution	
89	June 10, 1938	Empie Baldwin	25	25	0	Male	Black	North Carolina	Gas chamber	
90	June 13, 1938	Wendell Forrest Bowers	20	19	1	Male	White	Pennsylvania	Electrocution	
91	June 17, 1938	Levy Lamar Rozier	41	Unknown	Unknown	Male	White	Georgia	Electrocution	
92	June 17, 1938	Lonnie Gardner	27	26	1	Male	Black	North Carolina	Gas chamber	
93	June 17, 1938	Apsom Outlaw	28	27	1	Male	Black	North Carolina	Gas chamber	
94	June 17, 1938	Tommie Wells	24	Unknown	Unknown	Male	Black	Texas	Electrocution	
95	June 17, 1938	Mark Henry Calhoun	18	18	0	Male	Black	Texas	Electrocution	
96	June 20, 1938	Orson Williams	28	Unknown	Unknown	Male	Black	Florida	Electrocution	
97	June 24, 1938	Frank Carter	26	25	1	Male	Black	Arkansas	Electrocution	
98	June 24, 1938	Theo Thomas	28	27	1	Male	Black	Arkansas	Electrocution	
99	June 27, 1938	Thomas B. Williams	19	19	0	Male	Black	Ohio	Electrocution	
100	June 28, 1938	Robert Shaw	28	28	0	Male	White	Indiana	Electrocution	
101	June 30, 1938	Raymond Batson	32	28	4	Male	Black	Missouri	Gas chamber	
102	July 1, 1938	Wiley Brice	37	25	12	Male	Black	North Carolina	Electrocution	
103	July 1, 1938	William Andrew Payne	41	41	0	Male	White	North Carolina	Gas chamber	
104	July 1, 1938	John Washington Turner	36	36	0	Male	White	North Carolina	Gas chamber	
105	July 5, 1938	Willie Randolph	34	34	0	Male	Black	Florida	Electrocution	
106	July 6, 1938	William Hobbs	33	32	1	Male	White	Ohio	Electrocution	
107	July 8, 1938	Hugh Marshall Jr.	20	19	1	Male	White	Indiana	Electrocution	
108	July 8, 1938	Vurtis Neal	24	22	2	Male	White	Indiana	Electrocution	
109	July 8, 1938	Anthony Chebatoris	40	39	1	Male	White	Federal government	Hanging	
110	July 13, 1938	Robert Anderson Snow	27	27	0	Male	White	Ohio	Electrocution	
111	July 14, 1938	John Henry Seadlund	27	27	0	Male	White	Federal government	Electrocution	
112	July 15, 1938	Johnnie Jones	35	34	1	Male	Black	Missouri	Gas chamber	
113	July 18, 1938	Michael Fugmann	54	51	3	Male	White	Pennsylvania	Electrocution	
114	July 22, 1938	Mack Davidson	28	Unknown	Unknown	Male	Black	Alabama	Electrocution	
115	July 22, 1938	Gary Young	41	40	1	Male	Black	Alabama	Electrocution	
116	July 25, 1938	Arthur Mosby	26	Unknown	Unknown	Male	Black	Tennessee	Electrocution	
117	July 29, 1938	L. O. Goodman	Unknown	Unknown	Unknown	Male	Black	South Carolina	Electrocution	
118	July 29, 1938	Fobie Grays	22	22	0	Male	Black	Texas	Electrocution	
119	August 2, 1938	Vince Boss	22	20	2	Male	White	Texas	Electrocution	
120	August 5, 1938	Stanley N. Knapp	20	19	1	Male	White	Washington	Hanging	
121	August 11, 1938	Felix John Cummings	28	25	3	Male	White	New York	Electrocution	
122	August 11, 1938	George Lewis	26	23	3	Male	White	New York	Electrocution	
123	August 12, 1938	Glen J. Applegate	46	45	1	Male	White	Federal government	Hanging	
124	August 12, 1938	Robert J. Suhay	25	24	1	Male	White	Federal government	Hanging	
125	August 18, 1938	John Rylowicz	39	38	1	Male	White	New York	Electrocution	
126	August 19, 1938	Curtis Cobb	25	23	1	Male	Black	Alabama	Electrocution	
127	August 19, 1938	Willie James Whitfield	17	16	1	Male	Black	Alabama	Electrocution	
128	August 19, 1938	Callan Hardy Morgan	37	36	1	Male	White	Texas	Electrocution	
129	August 19, 1938	Jesus E. Polanco	22	19	3	Male	Hispanic	Texas	Electrocution	
130	August 23, 1938	William Albert Brown	24	23	1	Male	Black	New Jersey	Electrocution	
131	August 23, 1938	Smalley Burrell	24	23	1	Male	Black	New Jersey	Electrocution	
132	August 28, 1938	Richard Hammond	31	30	1	Male	Black	Maryland	Hanging	
133	August 29, 1938	James Albert Turner	25	Unknown	Unknown	Male	Black	Maryland	Hanging	
134	September 2, 1938	Francisco Aguirre	30	29	1	Male	Hispanic	California	Hanging	
135	September 2, 1938	Parkie Denny	44	42	2	Male	White	Kentucky	Electrocution	
136	September 16, 1938	Albert Dyer	33	31	2	Male	White	California	Hanging	
137	September 23, 1938	L. J. Jefferson	18	17	1	Male	Black	North Carolina	Gas chamber	
138	September 23, 1938	Tom Linney	32	31	1	Male	Black	North Carolina	Gas chamber	
139	September 26, 1938	William Gentry Peters	44	43	1	Male	Black	Ohio	Electrocution	
140	September 30, 1938	Henry A. Noelke	33	32	1	Male	White	Indiana	Electrocution	
141	September 30, 1938	George Ford	20	Unknown	Unknown	Male	Black	North Carolina	Gas chamber	
142	October 7, 1938	Adam C. Richetti	29	23	6	Male	White	Missouri	Gas chamber	
143	October 10, 1938	Fred Holland Mitchell	23	Unknown	Unknown	Male	Black	Pennsylvania	Electrocution	
144	October 14, 1938	Harrison Wells	49	48	1	Male	Black	California	Hanging	
145	October 21, 1938	John Jelliga	33	33	0	Male	White	Illinois	Electrocution	
146	October 21, 1938	Henry Mathias	Unknown	Unknown	Unknown	Male	White	Louisiana	Hanging	
147	October 26, 1938	Sam Thomas	23	22	1	Male	Black	Ohio	Electrocution	
148	October 28, 1938	Ralph Benton	40	39	1	Male	Black	Georgia	Electrocution	
149	October 28, 1938	Walter Melton	31	30	1	Male	Black	Georgia	Electrocution	
150	October 28, 1938	Leonard Mosley	43	43	0	Male	Black	Kentucky	Electrocution	
151	October 28, 1938	Granville Allen	28	26	2	Male	Black	Missouri	Gas chamber	
152	October 28, 1938	Salinas Canedo	26	24	2	Male	Hispanic	Texas	Electrocution	
153	October 31, 1938	Antonio Peronace	36	35	1	Male	White	Pennsylvania	Electrocution	
154	October 31, 1938	John W. Deering	40	39	1	Male	White	Utah	Firing squad	
155	November 3, 1938	Carl Ferrito	21	20	1	Male	White	Ohio	Electrocution	
156	November 4, 1938	Isaac McBride	31	30	1	Male	Black	Georgia	Electrocution	
157	November 4, 1938	Byron Ethelbert King	28	25	3	Male	White	Missouri	Gas chamber	
158	November 10, 1938	Buck Etheridge	20	Unknown	Unknown	Male	Black	Georgia	Electrocution	
159	November 18, 1938	Rhuel James Dalhover	32	31	1	Male	White	Federal government	Electrocution	
160	November 18, 1938	Ed Robinson	33	Unknown	Unknown	Male	Black	North Carolina	Gas chamber	
161	November 21, 1938	Joseph R. O'Donnell	40	37	3	Male	White	Washington	Hanging	
162	November 25, 1938	Jimmie Brown	25	25	0	Male	Black	Alabama	Electrocution	
163	November 25, 1938	Conrad Vaughan	27	Unknown	Unknown	Male	White	Alabama	Electrocution	
164	November 25, 1938	Frank Knight	26	Unknown	Unknown	Male	Black	Georgia	Electrocution	
165	November 25, 1938	Otis Cypress	29	29	0	Male	Black	Virginia	Electrocution	
166	November 25, 1938	George Washington Pingley	44	43	1	Male	White	Virginia	Electrocution	
167	November 29, 1938	Louis Carrol	23	23	0	Male	Black	Mississippi	Hanging	
168	November 30, 1938	George Gilbert	28	27	1	Male	Black	Georgia	Electrocution	
169	November 30, 1938	Fred Mosley	47	46	1	Male	White	Ohio	Electrocution	
170	December 2, 1938	Robert Lee Cannon	30	29	1	Male	White	California	Gas chamber	
171	December 2, 1938	Albert Kessel	29	28	1	Male	White	California	Gas chamber	
172	December 2, 1938	John Howie	29	28	1	Male	Black	North Carolina	Gas chamber	
173	December 7, 1938	Anna Marie Hahn	32	31	1	Female	White	Ohio	Electrocution	
174	December 9, 1938	Fred Barnes	40	39	1	Male	White	California	Gas chamber	
175	December 9, 1938	Wesley Eudy	34	33	1	Male	White	California	Gas chamber	
176	December 9, 1938	Raymond Carter	25	25	0	Male	Black	Georgia	Electrocution	
177	December 9, 1938	Arthur Mack	26	24	2	Male	Black	Georgia	Electrocution	
178	December 9, 1938	Arthur Perry	25	23	2	Male	Black	Georgia	Electrocution	
179	December 9, 1938	Charlie Rucker	18	18	0	Male	Black	Georgia	Electrocution	
180	December 9, 1938	Willie Drew Russell	31	31	0	Male	Black	Georgia	Electrocution	
181	December 9, 1938	John Henry Williams	21	21	0	Male	Black	Georgia	Electrocution	
182	December 9, 1938	Theodore Blanchard	24	24	0	Male	Black	Mississippi	Hanging	
183	December 9, 1938	William Baxter Parnell	33	33	0	Male	White	North Carolina	Gas chamber	
184	December 9, 1938	George Gates	21	Unknown	Unknown	Male	Black	South Carolina	Electrocution	
185	December 16, 1938	Ed Davis	37	36	1	Male	White	California	Gas chamber	
186	December 16, 1938	Morris Norman	20	20	0	Male	Black	Texas	Electrocution	
187	December 21, 1938	Stephen Figuli	21	20	1	Male	White	Ohio	Electrocution	
188	December 30, 1938	Adolph Smith	23	23	0	Male	Black	Alabama	Electrocution	

== Demographics ==
Gender
Male	186	99%
Female	2	1%
Ethnicity
White	94	50%
Black	89	47%
Hispanic	3	2%
Asian	1	1%
Native American	1	1%
State
North Carolina	18	10%
Texas	18	10%
Georgia	15	8%
Ohio	12	6%
Pennsylvania	12	6%
California	11	6%
Alabama	9	5%
Indiana	8	4%
Missouri	8	4%
Arkansas	7	4%
New Jersey	7	4%
New York	7	4%
Federal government	5	3%
Virginia	5	3%
Illinois	4	2%
Iowa	4	2%
Kentucky	4	2%
Louisiana	4	2%
Mississippi	4	2%
South Carolina	4	2%
Washington	4	2%
West Virginia	4	2%
Massachusetts	3	2%
Florida	2	1%
Maryland	2	1%
Tennessee	2	1%
Arizona	1	1%
Connecticut	1	1%
District of Columbia	1	1%
Montana	1	1%
Utah	1	1%
Method
Electrocution	123	65%
Hanging	33	18%
Gas chamber	32	17%
Firing squad	1	1%
Month
January	21	11%
February	12	6%
March	20	11%
April	17	9%
May	14	7%
June	17	9%
July	17	9%
August	15	8%
September	8	4%
October	13	7%
November	15	8%
December	19	10%
Age
Unknown	4	2%
10–19	10	5%
20–29	96	51%
30–39	51	27%
40–49	23	12%
50–59	3	2%
60–69	0	0%
70–79	1	1%
Total	188	100%

== Executions in recent years ==
Number of executions
1939	162
1938	188
1937	150
Total	500

Preceded by 1937	List of people executed in the United States in 1938	Succeeded by 1939
