= September 1937 Folsom escape attempt =

Coordinates: 38.6931°N 121.1617°W

- Date: September 19, 1937
- Location: Folsom State Prison, Folsom, California, United States

The September 1937 Folsom escape was an attempt by seven inmates to escape Folsom State Prison, a prison in the United States. During this attempt, Warden Clarence Larkin, Officer Harry Martin, and two of the escapees died. The remaining five were eventually executed.

== Attempt ==
Approximately 40 inmates had been waiting to speak with Warden Larkin about upcoming parole hearings when suddenly, seven of them launched an attack on him. Subsequently, they forcibly took him into the yard. In response to the unfolding chaos, guards began firing. During the ensuing commotion, both Officer Martin and Warden Larkin were stabbed to death. Officer Martin succumbed to his injuries at the scene, while Warden Larkin died five days later.

The inmates involved in the attack were said to have used shanks, prison-made knives, to attack the warden and the officer. Also, a prison-made wooden semiautomatic pistol, carved and meant for use in the attack, was found.

One of the seven inmates involved in the attempted escape was Ed Davis, a notable prisoner wanted for the murder of Officer James Hill of the Marlow, Oklahoma, Police Department, on April 20, 1931.

Two of the prisoners attempting to escape were shot and killed during the incident. The remaining five were all sentenced to death and eventually executed. Robert Lee Cannon and Albert Kessel became the first people to be executed in the state's newly opened gas chamber on December 2, 1938. Two others, Wesley Eudy and Fred Barnes, met the same fate on December 9, 1938. Finally, Ed Davis, the leader of the group, was executed on December 16, 1938.

== See also ==
- Capital punishment in California
- List of people executed in the United States in 1938
- List of homicides in California
