= List of people executed in the United States in 1936 =

One hundred and ninety-six people, one hundred and ninety-five male and one female, were executed in the United States in 1936, one hundred and thirty-four by electrocution, forty by hanging, twenty-one by gas chamber, and one by firing squad.

The last fully public execution in the United States occurred this year with the execution of Rainey Bethea.

== List of people executed in the United States in 1936 ==
No.	Date of execution	Name	Age of person			Gender	Ethnicity	State	Method	Ref.
No.	Date of execution	Name	At execution	At offense	Age difference	Gender	Ethnicity	State	Method	Ref.
1	January 7, 1936	Lonnie Green	32	31	1	Male	Black	Florida	Electrocution	
2	January 9, 1936	Newman Raymond Jr.	21	20	1	Male	White	New York	Electrocution	
3	January 9, 1936	Amerigo Angelini	21	20	1	Male	White	New York	Electrocution	
4	January 9, 1936	Thomas Gilbride Rooney	23	22	1	Male	White	New York	Electrocution	
5	January 9, 1936	Ray Orley	21	20	1	Male	White	New York	Electrocution	
6	January 10, 1936	Neal Bowman	33	31	2	Male	White	Kentucky	Electrocution	
7	January 10, 1936	Fred Hill	23	22	1	Male	Black	Texas	Electrocution	
8	January 13, 1936	Henry Carr	43	Unknown	Unknown	Male	Black	Texas	Electrocution	
9	January 14, 1936	Miller Frank Clark	44	42	2	Male	White	Massachusetts	Electrocution	
10	January 16, 1936	John Smith	41	Unknown	Unknown	Male	Black	New York	Electrocution	
11	January 16, 1936	Hamilton Howard "Albert" Fish	65	58	7	Male	White	New York	Electrocution	
12	January 17, 1936	Willard Preston Hall	34	32	2	Male	White	Kentucky	Electrocution	
13	January 17, 1936	Calvin Tate	21	19	2	Male	White	Kentucky	Electrocution	
14	January 17, 1936	Robert Dunlap	26	25	1	Male	White	North Carolina	Electrocution	
15	January 21, 1936	Walter Kennedy	22	20	2	Male	White	Tennessee	Electrocution	
16	January 21, 1936	Bill B. Lee	24	23	1	Male	White	Tennessee	Electrocution	
17	January 24, 1936	Allen Foster	20	19	1	Male	Black	North Carolina	Gas chamber	
18	January 28, 1936	Louis Willis	27	24	3	Male	Black	Tennessee	Electrocution	
19	January 31, 1936	James Matthews	19	Unknown	Unknown	Male	White	Kentucky	Electrocution	
20	January 31, 1936	Edward Lee Jenkins	49	48	1	Male	White	North Carolina	Gas chamber	
21	February 7, 1936	William Long	19	18	1	Male	Black	North Carolina	Electrocution	
22	February 7, 1936	J. T. Sanford	30	29	1	Male	Black	North Carolina	Gas chamber	
23	February 7, 1936	Thomas Watson	32	31	1	Male	Black	North Carolina	Gas chamber	
24	February 7, 1936	John Daugherty	44	43	1	Male	White	Virginia	Electrocution	
25	February 14, 1936	Otis McDaniel	31	30	1	Male	White	Colorado	Gas chamber	
26	February 14, 1936	Floyd Watson	21	19	2	Male	Black	Mississippi	Hanging	
27	February 21, 1936	Johnny Preston	36	Unknown	Unknown	Male	Black	Alabama	Electrocution	
28	February 21, 1936	Benny Lee	27	26	1	Male	Black	Kentucky	Electrocution	
29	February 21, 1936	Joe Jackson	23	22	1	Male	Black	Virginia	Electrocution	
30	February 21, 1936	John Shell	20	20	0	Male	Black	Virginia	Electrocution	
31	February 27, 1936	Francis A. Flynn	40	39	1	Male	White	New York	Electrocution	
32	March 6, 1936	Eddie B. Bowen	18	17	1	Male	Black	Georgia	Electrocution	
33	March 11, 1936	Norman Peacock	23	21	2	Male	White	Ohio	Electrocution	
34	March 19, 1936	Robert Alsup	Unknown	Unknown	2	Male	Black	Mississippi	Hanging	
35	March 19, 1936	Jake Johnson	36	35	1	Male	Black	North Carolina	Gas chamber	
36	March 20, 1936	Eddie Roper	30	Unknown	Unknown	Male	Black	Alabama	Electrocution	
37	March 20, 1936	Robert Dudley	27	Unknown	Unknown	Male	Black	Alabama	Electrocution	
38	March 20, 1936	Albert Preston	38	37	1	Male	Black	District of Columbia	Electrocution	
39	March 20, 1936	Thomas Nelson	37	36	1	Male	Black	Georgia	Electrocution	
40	March 20, 1936	John Henry Simmons	50	49	1	Male	Black	Georgia	Electrocution	
41	March 20, 1936	Erline Whitehead	35	33	2	Male	White	Kentucky	Electrocution	
42	March 20, 1936	Edwin Y. Hester	19	19	0	Male	White	North Carolina	Electrocution	
43	March 20, 1936	Roy Guyton	25	Unknown	Unknown	Male	Black	Oklahoma	Electrocution	
44	March 24, 1936	George W. Barrett	55	54	1	Male	White	Federal government	Hanging	
45	March 25, 1936	Julius Lowman	31	30	1	Male	Black	Georgia	Electrocution	
46	March 27, 1936	Henry Peterson	29	Unknown	Unknown	Male	Black	Alabama	Electrocution	
47	March 27, 1936	George Hall	29	26	3	Male	White	California	Hanging	
48	March 27, 1936	Bright Lee Buffkin	43	42	1	Male	White	North Carolina	Gas chamber	
49	April 3, 1936	Clarence Paul DeMoss	43	41	2	Male	White	California	Hanging	
50	April 3, 1936	Bruno Richard Hauptmann	35	31	4	Male	White	New Jersey	Electrocution	
51	April 3, 1936	Barney Fleming	29	29	0	Male	Black	Washington	Hanging	
52	April 7, 1936	John Simborski	30	29	1	Male	White	Connecticut	Hanging	
53	April 10, 1936	Hamp McLemore	21	19	2	Male	Black	Georgia	Electrocution	
54	April 10, 1936	Ernest Womack	18	17	1	Male	Black	Tennessee	Electrocution	
55	April 16, 1936	Howard Eichler	22	21	1	Male	White	New York	Electrocution	
56	April 16, 1936	Peter Mohlsick	21	20	1	Male	White	New York	Electrocution	
57	April 17, 1936	Willie E. Bynum	26	Unknown	Unknown	Male	Black	Alabama	Electrocution	
58	April 17, 1936	Gaston Slaughter	36	34	2	Male	Black	Indiana	Electrocution	
59	April 23, 1936	Nick Buckvich	42	41	1	Male	White	New York	Electrocution	
60	April 24, 1936	James Richard Hargus	26	24	2	Male	White	Oklahoma	Electrocution	
61	April 25, 1936	James Thompson	27	23	4	Male	White	Ohio	Electrocution	
62	May 1, 1936	Thomas Edward Dugger	31	30	1	Male	White	California	Hanging	
63	May 4, 1936	Virgil H. Stalkup	28	26	2	Male	White	Texas	Electrocution	
64	May 8, 1936	Lawrence Dingle	32	31	1	Male	Black	North Carolina	Gas chamber	
65	May 8, 1936	Germie Williams	23	22	1	Male	Black	North Carolina	Gas chamber	
66	May 15, 1936	Waddell Cosey	30	29	1	Male	Black	Alabama	Electrocution	
67	May 15, 1936	Jimmie Stewart	33	31	2	Male	Black	Alabama	Electrocution	
68	May 15, 1936	Jack Sullivan	23	21	2	Male	White	Arizona	Gas chamber	
69	May 15, 1936	Roy Simmons	22	21	1	Male	Black	Kentucky	Electrocution	
70	May 15, 1936	Alfred Drake	30	29	1	Male	Black	Kentucky	Electrocution	
71	May 22, 1936	Earl Bud Kimball	22	21	1	Male	White	California	Hanging	
72	May 22, 1936	Joseph Kristy	27	25	2	Male	White	California	Hanging	
73	May 22, 1936	Alexander MacKay	29	27	2	Male	White	California	Hanging	
74	May 22, 1936	Arthur Berry	Unknown	Unknown	0	Male	Black	Mississippi	Hanging	
75	May 22, 1936	Earnest K. Harris	19	17	2	Male	Black	Tennessee	Electrocution	
76	May 25, 1936	Clarence Thompson	35	34	1	Male	Black	Pennsylvania	Electrocution	
77	May 29, 1936	James Russell Woodford	22	19	3	Male	Black	Kentucky	Electrocution	
78	May 29, 1936	Marvin Elmer Batten	29	29	0	Male	White	North Carolina	Gas chamber	
79	May 29, 1936	Charles Kropowitz	22	20	2	Male	White	New York	Electrocution	
80	May 29, 1936	George Rosenberg	22	20	2	Male	White	New York	Electrocution	
81	May 29, 1936	Frank Russo	23	21	2	Male	White	New York	Electrocution	
82	May 29, 1936	Vincent DeMartino	27	25	2	Male	White	New York	Electrocution	
83	May 29, 1936	Willie Dickerson	19	19	0	Male	Black	Texas	Electrocution	
84	May 29, 1936	Glenn R. Stringer	24	22	2	Male	White	Washington	Hanging	
85	May 30, 1936	Aria Tance	29	27	2	Male	Black	Texas	Electrocution	
86	June 2, 1936	Charles Zied	37	35	2	Male	White	New Jersey	Electrocution	
87	June 4, 1936	Damiano Consentino	39	38	1	Male	White	New York	Electrocution	
88	June 5, 1936	Joseph Wheeler Gast	38	37	1	Male	White	Alabama	Electrocution	
89	June 5, 1936	Jesse C. Boulton	49	47	2	Male	White	California	Hanging	
90	June 5, 1936	Homer Young	39	38	1	Male	Black	Kentucky	Electrocution	
91	June 5, 1936	James D. McAllister	37	36	1	Male	White	Texas	Electrocution	
92	June 5, 1936	William Richard Davis	20	19	1	Male	Black	Texas	Electrocution	
93	June 10, 1936	Fedro Pearson	25	24	1	Male	Black	Mississippi	Hanging	
94	June 12, 1936	Tyrie Harrell	44	43	1	Male	Black	Alabama	Electrocution	
95	June 12, 1936	Wesley Vincent	20	19	1	Male	White	Alabama	Electrocution	
96	June 12, 1936	Gabriel Waters	19	18	1	Male	Black	Alabama	Electrocution	
97	June 12, 1936	Elton M. Stone	30	29	1	Male	White	California	Hanging	
98	June 12, 1936	Augusto Perez	22	Unknown	Unknown	Male	Hispanic	Maryland	Hanging	
99	June 12, 1936	Willie Williams	25	Unknown	Unknown	Male	Black	Maryland	Hanging	
100	June 19, 1936	Elmer Newton Arant	34	33	1	Male	White	Alabama	Electrocution	
101	June 19, 1936	Walter Miller	38	38	0	Male	Black	Alabama	Electrocution	
102	June 19, 1936	Louis N. Gosden	32	31	1	Male	White	California	Hanging	
103	June 19, 1936	Robert Wilson Pullen	38	37	1	Male	White	Mississippi	Hanging	
104	June 19, 1936	John Horne	37	36	1	Male	White	North Carolina	Gas chamber	
105	June 19, 1936	Arthur James Gooch	27	25	2	Male	White	Federal government	Hanging	
106	June 23, 1936	Donald Eberle Sr.	31	30	1	Male	White	Ohio	Electrocution	
107	June 23, 1936	Juan Rivera	24	23	1	Male	Hispanic	Texas	Electrocution	
108	June 26, 1936	Robert Ashley	18	18	0	Male	Black	South Carolina	Electrocution	
109	June 29, 1936	Ed Bradley	56	56	0	Male	White	Florida	Electrocution	
110	July 1, 1936	Richard Keller	30	27	3	Male	White	Ohio	Electrocution	
111	July 3, 1936	Tom Perkins	29	29	0	Male	Black	Alabama	Electrocution	
112	July 3, 1936	Isaac Frank Watson	54	54	0	Male	Black	Virginia	Electrocution	
113	July 9, 1936	John Collins	27	26	1	Male	White	New York	Electrocution	
114	July 10, 1936	A. B. Smiley	30	29	1	Male	Black	Alabama	Electrocution	
115	July 10, 1936	Frank Rascon	27	26	1	Male	Hispanic	Arizona	Gas chamber	
116	July 10, 1936	Irwin B. Ottey	35	33	2	Male	White	California	Hanging	
117	July 10, 1936	Alexander A. Morrison	37	36	1	Male	Black	Louisiana	Hanging	
118	July 10, 1936	James J. Morrison	30	28	2	Male	Black	Louisiana	Hanging	
119	July 10, 1936	Richard Valentine	Unknown	Unknown	1	Male	Black	Louisiana	Hanging	
120	July 10, 1936	Roosevelt Moon	Unknown	Unknown	1	Male	Black	Mississippi	Hanging	
121	July 10, 1936	Henry Grier	43	42	1	Male	Black	North Carolina	Electrocution	
122	July 10, 1936	Grady Lee Warren	25	23	2	Male	White	Texas	Electrocution	
123	July 10, 1936	Mack Coupie Brown	34	33	1	Male	Black	Texas	Electrocution	
124	July 10, 1936	Oscar Brown	26	25	1	Male	Black	Texas	Electrocution	
125	July 10, 1936	Delbert Emery Green	28	21	7	Male	White	Utah	Firing squad	
126	July 12, 1936	Earl Gardner	29	29	0	Male	Native American	Federal government	Hanging	
127	July 16, 1936	Mary Frances Creighton	36	36	0	Female	White	New York	Electrocution	
128	July 16, 1936	Everett Clifford Appelgate	36	35	1	Male	White	New York	Electrocution	
129	July 17, 1936	William Abraham Hodgin	36	35	1	Male	Black	North Carolina	Gas chamber	
130	July 23, 1936	Raymond Flores	26	25	1	Male	Hispanic	New York	Electrocution	
131	July 24, 1936	Antonio Cabrera	22	21	1	Male	Hispanic	California	Hanging	
132	July 24, 1936	Wash Desseseau	25	25	0	Male	Black	South Carolina	Electrocution	
133	July 24, 1936	James Mixon	20	20	0	Male	Black	South Carolina	Electrocution	
134	July 24, 1936	Thomas Cole Hart	29	25	4	Male	White	Virginia	Electrocution	
135	July 31, 1936	Oscar Patterson	24	24	0	Male	Black	Alabama	Electrocution	
136	July 31, 1936	Glenn Melvin Warren	33	31	2	Male	White	Texas	Electrocution	
137	August 4, 1936	Newell Paige Sherman	27	26	1	Male	White	Massachusetts	Electrocution	
138	August 4, 1936	Edward Metelski	27	26	1	Male	White	New Jersey	Electrocution	
139	August 5, 1936	John Pleyer	31	29	2	Male	White	Ohio	Electrocution	
140	August 6, 1936	John Henry Thomas	21	21	0	Male	Black	Georgia	Electrocution	
141	August 7, 1936	Ed Lee Summerville	35	25	10	Male	Black	Alabama	Electrocution	
142	August 14, 1936	John B. Berryman	43	42	1	Male	White	California	Hanging	
143	August 14, 1936	Charles James	33	32	1	Male	Black	California	Hanging	
144	August 14, 1936	Rainey Bethea	26	26	0	Male	Black	Kentucky	Hanging	
145	August 14, 1936	Curley H. Ballard	56	56	0	Male	Black	Tennessee	Electrocution	
146	August 14, 1936	James Smith	27	26	1	Male	Black	Tennessee	Electrocution	
147	August 14, 1936	James Clark	23	22	1	Male	Black	Tennessee	Electrocution	
148	August 20, 1936	Thomas McFarland	38	37	1	Male	White	New York	Electrocution	
149	August 21, 1936	Demps Charles	28	27	1	Male	Black	Georgia	Electrocution	
150	August 21, 1936	John Daniel	24	23	1	Male	Black	Georgia	Electrocution	
151	August 21, 1936	Willie Lee Gallman	21	20	1	Male	Black	North Carolina	Gas chamber	
152	August 21, 1936	John Kinyon	73	72	1	Male	Black	North Carolina	Gas chamber	
153	August 24, 1936	George Dixon	27	27	0	Male	Black	Florida	Electrocution	
154	August 27, 1936	Charles Rogas	35	34	1	Male	White	New York	Electrocution	
155	September 4, 1936	George Alston	24	23	1	Male	Black	North Carolina	Gas chamber	
156	September 4, 1936	James Buchanan Carden Sr.	42	39	3	Male	White	North Carolina	Electrocution	
157	September 11, 1936	Bill Sam	33	Unknown	Unknown	Male	Asian	California	Hanging	
158	September 11, 1936	Leo Rodrick Bernard Hall	34	31	3	Male	White	Washington	Hanging	
159	September 18, 1936	John V. Kellogg	21	20	1	Male	Black	California	Hanging	
160	October 2, 1936	Roland H. Cochrane	28	26	2	Male	White	Arizona	Gas chamber	
161	October 16, 1936	Lloyd A. Dale	36	35	1	Male	Black	California	Hanging	
162	October 19, 1936	Clarence D. Casey	27	23	4	Male	White	Florida	Electrocution	
163	October 19, 1936	James R. Milligan	25	21	4	Male	White	Florida	Electrocution	
164	October 19, 1936	Luther D. Padgett	28	26	2	Male	White	Florida	Electrocution	
165	October 19, 1936	Lee Clark	31	Unknown	Unknown	Male	Black	Florida	Electrocution	
166	October 19, 1936	Clarence E. Thomas	31	31	0	Male	White	Indiana	Electrocution	
167	October 21, 1936	Frank Korczykowski	26	25	1	Male	White	Illinois	Electrocution	
168	October 21, 1936	Andrzej Bogacki	25	24	1	Male	White	Illinois	Electrocution	
169	October 23, 1936	Roy House	21	20	1	Male	White	Arkansas	Electrocution	
170	October 23, 1936	Elmo Banks	43	43	0	Male	Black	Texas	Electrocution	
171	October 23, 1936	Antonio Carrasco	35	33	2	Male	Hispanic	Texas	Electrocution	
172	October 26, 1936	Rufus Johnson	20	Unknown	Unknown	Male	Black	Florida	Electrocution	
173	October 26, 1936	George W. Scroggins	41	Unknown	Unknown	Male	Black	Florida	Electrocution	
174	November 6, 1936	Dennis Turner	45	44	1	Male	White	Arkansas	Electrocution	
175	November 6, 1936	Andrew Hemphill	45	45	0	Male	Black	Mississippi	Hanging	
176	November 6, 1936	Thomas Jones	43	43	0	Male	Black	Mississippi	Hanging	
177	November 12, 1936	Arthur Coombs	30	Unknown	Unknown	Male	Black	Georgia	Electrocution	
178	November 13, 1936	John Pressley	43	42	1	Male	Black	North Carolina	Electrocution	
179	November 18, 1936	Elmer Barrett	23	Unknown	Unknown	Male	Black	Tennessee	Electrocution	
180	November 20, 1936	George Scott	26	26	0	Male	Black	Delaware	Hanging	
181	November 20, 1936	Evans Macklin	20	20	0	Male	Black	North Carolina	Gas chamber	
182	November 20, 1936	Willie Tate	28	28	0	Male	Black	North Carolina	Gas chamber	
183	December 4, 1936	Albert Walter Jr.	28	28	0	Male	White	California	Hanging	
184	December 4, 1936	Winton Boyer	27	25	2	Male	Black	Georgia	Electrocution	
185	December 4, 1936	James Brown	27	26	1	Male	Black	Ohio	Electrocution	
186	December 11, 1936	Farlander McCormick	35	34	1	Male	Black	Arkansas	Electrocution	
187	December 11, 1936	Willie Smith	25	24	1	Male	Black	Arkansas	Electrocution	
188	December 11, 1936	Beverly White	25	24	1	Male	Black	Arkansas	Electrocution	
189	December 11, 1936	Martin Moore	22	22	0	Male	Black	North Carolina	Gas chamber	
190	December 11, 1936	Samuel W. Anderson	25	24	1	Male	White	South Carolina	Electrocution	
191	December 11, 1936	Samuel H. Powell	26	25	1	Male	White	South Carolina	Electrocution	
192	December 14, 1936	James W. Walker	30	30	0	Male	Black	Florida	Electrocution	
193	December 14, 1936	Richard Williams	32	32	0	Male	Black	Florida	Electrocution	
194	December 18, 1936	George Linus McKeever	35	32	3	Male	White	Missouri	Hanging	
195	December 26, 1936	Harry Singer	25	25	0	Male	White	Indiana	Electrocution	
196	December 31, 1936	John Henry Sloan	25	24	1	Male	Black	Georgia	Electrocution	

== Demographics ==
Gender
Male	195	99%
Female	1	1%
Ethnicity
Black	100	51%
White	88	45%
Hispanic	6	3%
Asian	1	1%
Native American	1	1%
State
North Carolina	23	12%
New York	21	11%
Alabama	17	9%
California	17	9%
Texas	14	7%
Florida	11	6%
Georgia	11	6%
Kentucky	11	6%
Tennessee	9	5%
Mississippi	8	4%
Ohio	6	3%
Arkansas	5	3%
South Carolina	5	3%
Virginia	5	3%
Arizona	3	2%
Federal government	3	2%
Indiana	3	2%
Louisiana	3	2%
New Jersey	3	2%
Washington	3	2%
Illinois	2	1%
Maryland	2	1%
Massachusetts	2	1%
Oklahoma	2	1%
Colorado	1	1%
Connecticut	1	1%
Delaware	1	1%
District of Columbia	1	1%
Missouri	1	1%
Pennsylvania	1	1%
Utah	1	1%
Method
Electrocution	134	68%
Hanging	40	20%
Gas chamber	21	11%
Firing squad	1	1%
Month
January	20	10%
February	11	6%
March	17	9%
April	13	7%
May	24	12%
June	24	12%
July	27	14%
August	18	9%
September	5	3%
October	14	7%
November	9	5%
December	14	7%
Age
Unknown	4	2%
10–19	9	5%
20–29	96	49%
30–39	60	31%
40–49	20	10%
50–59	5	3%
60–69	1	1%
70–79	1	1%
Total	196	100%

== Executions in recent years ==
Number of executions
1937	150
1936	196
1935	198
Total	544

Preceded by 1935	List of people executed in the United States in 1936	Succeeded by 1937
