= List of people executed in the United States in 1937 =

One hundred and fifty people, one hundred and forty-nine male and one female, were executed in the United States in 1937, ninety-nine by electrocution, thirty-three by hanging, and eighteen by gas chamber.

Tommie Howard became the last person to be executed in the United States for attempted murder. Howard shot a man in the head during a robbery. The victim was permanently incapacitated and died from his injuries nine months after Howard's execution. Howard had previously served 10 years of a life sentence for a prior murder conviction.

The last semipublic execution in the United States occurred this year, that being the execution of Roscoe Jackson.

== List of people executed in the United States in 1937 ==
No.	Date of execution	Name	Age of person			Gender	Ethnicity	State	Method	Ref.
No.	Date of execution	Name	At execution	At offense	Age difference	Gender	Ethnicity	State	Method	Ref.
1	January 3, 1937	Isaiah Opher Jr.	36	36	0	Male	Black	Delaware	Hanging	
2	January 4, 1937	Jacob M. Gable	21	19	2	Male	White	Pennsylvania	Electrocution	
3	January 7, 1937	Theodore DiDonne	31	30	1	Male	White	New York	Electrocution	
4	January 7, 1937	Joseph Bolognia	24	23	1	Male	White	New York	Electrocution	
5	January 8, 1937	Frank Duarte	24	22	2	Male	Hispanic	Arizona	Gas chamber	
6	January 8, 1937	Joe Joven	32	31	1	Male	Asian	California	Hanging	
7	January 14, 1937	Louis Lazar	29	26	3	Male	White	New York	Electrocution	
8	January 15, 1937	Louis R. Shaver	53	51	2	Male	White	California	Hanging	
9	January 15, 1937	Tommie Howard	38	38	0	Male	Black	Louisiana	Hanging	
10	January 15, 1937	Johnnie Sanders	20	19	1	Male	Black	Louisiana	Hanging	
11	January 20, 1937	George Owens	17	16	1	Male	Black	Mississippi	Hanging	
12	January 20, 1937	Joe Phillips	16	15	1	Male	Black	Mississippi	Hanging	
13	January 21, 1937	Chester White	33	Unknown	Unknown	Male	Black	New York	Electrocution	
14	January 21, 1937	John Fiorenza	25	24	1	Male	White	New York	Electrocution	
15	January 21, 1937	Charles Ham	20	19	1	Male	Black	New York	Electrocution	
16	January 21, 1937	Frederick Fowler	19	18	1	Male	Black	New York	Electrocution	
17	January 22, 1937	Natividad Valenzuela	24	23	1	Male	Hispanic	California	Hanging	
18	January 26, 1937	Luther Jones	32	32	0	Male	White	Nevada	Gas chamber	
19	January 29, 1937	Edgar Prude Skelton	36	Unknown	Unknown	Male	White	Alabama	Electrocution	
20	February 1, 1937	Robert Dreamer	40	30	10	Male	White	Pennsylvania	Electrocution	
21	February 10, 1937	James Joseph McElroy	45	45	0	Male	White	Connecticut	Electrocution	
22	February 11, 1937	Alfred E. Volckmann Jr.	21	19	2	Male	White	New York	Electrocution	
23	February 19, 1937	George B. Underwood	23	22	1	Male	White	Kentucky	Electrocution	
24	February 24, 1937	Arthur Burden	28	25	3	Male	Black	Georgia	Electrocution	
25	February 26, 1937	James Victor Franklin	32	Unknown	Unknown	Male	White	Alabama	Electrocution	
26	February 26, 1937	Allen Mitchell	32	Unknown	Unknown	Male	Black	Illinois	Electrocution	
27	February 26, 1937	Rufo Swain	27	Unknown	Unknown	Male	Black	Illinois	Electrocution	
28	February 26, 1937	Hurt Hardy Jr.	32	30	2	Male	White	Missouri	Hanging	
29	March 2, 1937	Joseph Rappaport	35	33	2	Male	White	Illinois	Electrocution	
30	March 5, 1937	James Turner	24	23	1	Male	Black	Tennessee	Electrocution	
31	March 12, 1937	Chester Arkuszewski	24	23	1	Male	White	Indiana	Electrocution	
32	March 15, 1937	James Taylor	24	23	1	Male	Black	Tennessee	Electrocution	
33	March 17, 1937	Anderson Berry	26	24	2	Male	Black	Tennessee	Electrocution	
34	March 18, 1937	Samuel Williams	23	22	1	Male	Black	Mississippi	Hanging	
35	March 18, 1937	Tom Franklin	20	19	1	Male	Black	Tennessee	Electrocution	
36	March 19, 1937	Sam Franklin	24	22	2	Male	Black	Kentucky	Electrocution	
37	March 31, 1937	Petronilo Pacren	40	39	1	Male	Asian	California	Hanging	
38	April 2, 1937	Fred Adams	21	18	3	Male	White	Missouri	Hanging	
39	April 8, 1937	Gus McCoig	25	23	2	Male	White	Tennessee	Electrocution	
40	April 9, 1937	Ralph Eisenhardt	21	19	2	Male	White	Louisiana	Hanging	
41	April 9, 1937	Gladstone James	24	22	2	Male	White	Louisiana	Hanging	
42	April 9, 1937	George McDuffie	22	21	1	Male	Black	South Carolina	Electrocution	
43	April 13, 1937	Frank Pramera	23	Unknown	Unknown	Male	White	West Virginia	Hanging	
44	April 16, 1937	Fred Hart	44	43	1	Male	White	California	Hanging	
45	April 16, 1937	Joseph Schuster	30	29	1	Male	White	Illinois	Electrocution	
46	April 16, 1937	Stanley Murawski	37	36	1	Male	White	Illinois	Electrocution	
47	April 16, 1937	Frank Matthew Whyte	42	41	1	Male	White	Illinois	Electrocution	
48	April 16, 1937	Roy Wilburn Eatmon	24	22	2	Male	White	Tennessee	Electrocution	
49	April 19, 1937	James Burke	24	22	2	Male	Black	Georgia	Electrocution	
50	April 23, 1937	Clinton Medlock	29	26	3	Male	Black	Arkansas	Electrocution	
51	April 23, 1937	John Homer Cummings	29	26	3	Male	Black	District of Columbia	Electrocution	
52	April 23, 1937	Willett Marcus	23	20	3	Male	Black	District of Columbia	Electrocution	
53	April 23, 1937	Willie Walker	34	34	0	Male	Black	Florida	Electrocution	
54	April 29, 1937	Mary Holmes	35	34	1	Female	Black	Mississippi	Hanging	
55	April 29, 1937	Selmon Brooks	32	31	1	Male	Black	Mississippi	Hanging	
56	April 30, 1937	Howard Lee Dunn	24	23	1	Male	White	Tennessee	Electrocution	
57	April 30, 1937	William Farmer	19	18	1	Male	White	Tennessee	Electrocution	
58	April 30, 1937	Elmer Pruitt	24	21	3	Male	Black	Texas	Electrocution	
59	May 3, 1937	Andy Yacas	52	51	1	Male	White	Pennsylvania	Electrocution	
60	May 10, 1937	Simee Lee Fields	21	19	2	Male	Black	Florida	Electrocution	
61	May 10, 1937	Marcus England	36	35	1	Male	Black	Pennsylvania	Electrocution	
62	May 10, 1937	Edward Shawell	38	38	0	Male	Black	Pennsylvania	Electrocution	
63	May 14, 1937	James Austin Jr.	22	21	1	Male	Black	Arkansas	Electrocution	
64	May 14, 1937	John P. Goodman	21	Unknown	Unknown	Male	Black	Georgia	Electrocution	
65	May 19, 1937	Stephen Kotowicz	22	22	0	Male	White	Ohio	Electrocution	
66	May 21, 1937	Will Lacy	41	39	2	Male	Black	Georgia	Electrocution	
67	May 21, 1937	Eli C. Melton	30	28	2	Male	White	Georgia	Electrocution	
68	May 21, 1937	Dudley Barr	39	35	4	Male	Black	Missouri	Hanging	
69	May 21, 1937	Roscoe Jackson	36	33	3	Male	White	Missouri	Hanging	
70	May 24, 1937	Leonard Brown	18	17	1	Male	Black	Georgia	Electrocution	
71	May 28, 1937	John Woods	49	48	1	Male	Black	California	Hanging	
72	May 28, 1937	Mose Trammell	36	35	1	Male	Black	Georgia	Electrocution	
73	May 28, 1937	Lonnie Lee Joiner	38	37	1	Male	White	Texas	Electrocution	
74	June 4, 1937	Joseph Nelson	36	36	0	Male	Black	Delaware	Hanging	
75	June 4, 1937	Augustus Dwight Beard	27	26	1	Male	White	Texas	Electrocution	
76	June 4, 1937	Wisie Ellison	36	35	1	Male	Black	Texas	Electrocution	
77	June 10, 1937	William A. Kuhlman	28	27	1	Male	White	Indiana	Electrocution	
78	June 10, 1937	John Joseph Poholsky	35	34	1	Male	White	Indiana	Electrocution	
79	June 10, 1937	Frank Gore Williams	39	38	1	Male	White	Indiana	Electrocution	
80	June 10, 1937	Chew Wing	32	31	1	Male	Asian	New York	Electrocution	
81	June 11, 1937	Roosevelt Collins	31	30	1	Male	Black	Alabama	Electrocution	
82	June 11, 1937	William Gill	28	27	1	Male	Black	Louisiana	Hanging	
83	June 11, 1937	Robert Lucas	27	Unknown	Unknown	Male	Black	Louisiana	Hanging	
84	June 11, 1937	Charles A. Sands	22	20	2	Male	Native American	Oklahoma	Electrocution	
85	June 11, 1937	Leon Siler	22	20	2	Male	White	Oklahoma	Electrocution	
86	June 14, 1937	Willie Hopkins	21	21	0	Male	Black	Georgia	Electrocution	
87	June 18, 1937	Edgar Rose	27	26	1	Male	White	Georgia	Electrocution	
88	June 18, 1937	James Worthy	24	24	0	Male	Black	Georgia	Electrocution	
89	June 25, 1937	Charlie Young	33	Unknown	Unknown	Male	Black	Georgia	Electrocution	
90	June 25, 1937	William V. Beckner	30	29	1	Male	White	West Virginia	Hanging	
91	June 28, 1937	Roy Crittenton	36	34	2	Male	Black	Pennsylvania	Electrocution	
92	July 1, 1937	Robert Jones	Unknown	Unknown	Unknown	Male	Black	Mississippi	Hanging	
93	July 1, 1937	Harry Eisenberg	43	42	1	Male	White	New York	Electrocution	
94	July 1, 1937	Watson Edwards	25	24	1	Male	White	New York	Electrocution	
95	July 1, 1937	Anthony Garlaus	33	32	1	Male	White	New York	Electrocution	
96	July 2, 1937	Clemens Konstantin Matura	66	65	1	Male	White	Texas	Electrocution	
97	July 9, 1937	John D. McNeill	54	53	1	Male	White	California	Hanging	
98	July 9, 1937	Mitchell Jackson	27	27	0	Male	Black	Georgia	Electrocution	
99	July 9, 1937	James Irvin Howard	21	20	1	Male	Black	Maryland	Hanging	
100	July 9, 1937	Robert Glenn Brown	19	18	1	Male	Black	North Carolina	Gas chamber	
101	July 9, 1937	Earnest McCarty	19	18	1	Male	Black	Texas	Electrocution	
102	July 12, 1937	Marcus C. Powell	51	50	1	Male	White	Florida	Electrocution	
103	July 12, 1937	Alexander Thweatt Meyer	19	19	0	Male	White	Pennsylvania	Electrocution	
104	July 16, 1937	Arnold Clift	24	23	1	Male	White	Kentucky	Electrocution	
105	July 16, 1937	Fred Steele	22	Unknown	Unknown	Male	Black	North Carolina	Gas chamber	
106	July 16, 1937	Sam Jones	21	Unknown	Unknown	Male	Black	North Carolina	Gas chamber	
107	July 19, 1937	Preston McDonald	28	26	2	Male	Black	Florida	Electrocution	
108	July 19, 1937	Walter Williams	38	36	2	Male	Black	Florida	Electrocution	
109	July 23, 1937	Robert Hinds	17	17	0	Male	Black	Florida	Electrocution	
110	July 23, 1937	Fred Grey	26	Unknown	Unknown	Male	Black	North Carolina	Gas chamber	
111	July 23, 1937	Hunter Winchester	24	Unknown	Unknown	Male	Black	North Carolina	Gas chamber	
112	July 26, 1937	John Becker	38	37	1	Male	White	Pennsylvania	Electrocution	
113	July 30, 1937	Willie E. Douberly	25	24	1	Male	White	Georgia	Electrocution	
114	July 30, 1937	Thomas Perry	23	Unknown	Unknown	Male	Black	North Carolina	Gas chamber	
115	July 30, 1937	A. W. Watson	21	20	1	Male	White	North Carolina	Gas chamber	
116	July 30, 1937	George Washington Patton	56	51	5	Male	White	Texas	Electrocution	
117	August 5, 1937	Solomon Mahoe	32	30	2	Male	Pacific Islander	Hawaii Territory	Hanging	
118	August 6, 1937	Milford George Exum	23	22	1	Male	Black	North Carolina	Gas chamber	
119	August 9, 1937	Jimmie Lee Parrish	35	Unknown	Unknown	Male	Black	Tennessee	Electrocution	
120	August 10, 1937	Fred Ritchie	32	Unknown	Unknown	Male	White	Tennessee	Electrocution	
121	August 13, 1937	Burt Anderson	53	52	1	Male	White	Arizona	Gas chamber	
122	August 13, 1937	Ernest Patten	37	36	1	Male	Black	Arizona	Gas chamber	
123	August 13, 1937	Francisco A. Aguilar	34	33	1	Male	Hispanic	Colorado	Gas chamber	
124	August 13, 1937	Lawrence R. Ward	51	50	1	Male	White	Georgia	Electrocution	
125	August 13, 1937	James McNeill	21	19	2	Male	Black	North Carolina	Electrocution	
126	August 13, 1937	Leroy McNeill	18	17	1	Male	Black	North Carolina	Gas chamber	
127	August 13, 1937	Perry Hampton Carroll	37	35	2	Male	White	Wyoming	Gas chamber	
128	August 19, 1937	Major Green	34	33	1	Male	Black	New York	Electrocution	
129	August 20, 1937	Furman McDonald	44	42	2	Male	White	South Carolina	Electrocution	
130	August 20, 1937	Luke Trammell Jr.	28	27	1	Male	White	Texas	Electrocution	
131	August 20, 1937	Willie Leake	30	Unknown	Unknown	Male	Black	Virginia	Electrocution	
132	August 20, 1937	Lawrence Wyche	30	Unknown	Unknown	Male	Black	Virginia	Electrocution	
133	August 26, 1937	Louis Apicello	40	39	1	Male	White	New York	Electrocution	
134	September 3, 1937	Thomas Jefferson Hutto	51	50	1	Male	White	Arkansas	Electrocution	
135	September 3, 1937	David Benjamin Knight	33	31	2	Male	White	Arizona	Gas chamber	
136	September 10, 1937	Arthur Oliver	46	43	3	Male	White	Alabama	Electrocution	
137	September 10, 1937	Mervin Brown	33	Unknown	Unknown	Male	Black	West Virginia	Hanging	
138	September 17, 1937	Raymond A. Fortune	26	25	1	Male	White	Indiana	Electrocution	
139	September 24, 1937	Marion Sandy Edwards	63	Unknown	Unknown	Male	Black	Arkansas	Electrocution	
140	September 29, 1937	Clinton Pinson	40	36	4	Male	Black	Georgia	Electrocution	
141	October 15, 1937	Jessie Amos	35	Unknown	Unknown	Male	Black	Arkansas	Electrocution	
142	October 15, 1937	Peter Chrisoulas	40	39	1	Male	White	Illinois	Electrocution	
143	November 5, 1937	William Brown Read	25	24	1	Male	White	West Virginia	Hanging	
144	November 12, 1937	Perry Marion	28	27	1	Male	White	Kentucky	Electrocution	
145	December 3, 1937	Charles McGuire	30	29	1	Male	White	California	Hanging	
146	December 10, 1937	Walter Caldwell	37	36	1	Male	Black	North Carolina	Gas chamber	
147	December 10, 1937	William Clifton Perry	17	17	0	Male	Black	North Carolina	Gas chamber	
148	December 17, 1937	John L. Montjoy Jr.	23	21	2	Male	Black	Kentucky	Hanging	
149	December 27, 1937	Willie Frank Daniels	25	24	1	Male	Black	Georgia	Electrocution	
150	December 31, 1937	John Winsor	25	Unknown	Unknown	Male	Black	Virginia	Electrocution	

== Demographics ==
Gender
Male	149	99%
Female	1	1%
Ethnicity
Black	75	50%
White	67	45%
Asian	3	2%
Hispanic	3	2%
Native American	1	1%
Pacific Islander	1	1%
State
Georgia	16	11%
New York	14	9%
North Carolina	12	8%
Tennessee	10	7%
California	8	5%
Pennsylvania	8	5%
Texas	8	5%
Illinois	7	5%
Florida	6	4%
Louisiana	6	4%
Mississippi	6	4%
Arkansas	5	3%
Indiana	5	3%
Kentucky	5	3%
Alabama	4	3%
Arizona	4	3%
Missouri	4	3%
West Virginia	4	3%
Virginia	3	2%
Delaware	2	1%
District of Columbia	2	1%
Oklahoma	2	1%
South Carolina	2	1%
Colorado	1	1%
Connecticut	1	1%
Hawaii Territory	1	1%
Maryland	1	1%
Nevada	1	1%
Ohio	1	1%
Wyoming	1	1%
Method
Electrocution	99	66%
Hanging	33	22%
Gas chamber	18	12%
Month
January	19	13%
February	9	6%
March	9	6%
April	21	14%
May	15	10%
June	18	12%
July	25	17%
August	17	11%
September	7	5%
October	2	1%
November	2	1%
December	6	4%
Age
Unknown	1	1%
10–19	11	7%
20–29	66	44%
30–39	49	33%
40–49	13	9%
50–59	8	5%
60–69	3	2%
Total	150	100%

== Executions in recent years ==
Number of executions
1938	188
1937	150
1936	196
Total	534

Preceded by 1936	List of people executed in the United States in 1937	Succeeded by 1938
