= Rush Griffin =

1934–35 California capital case

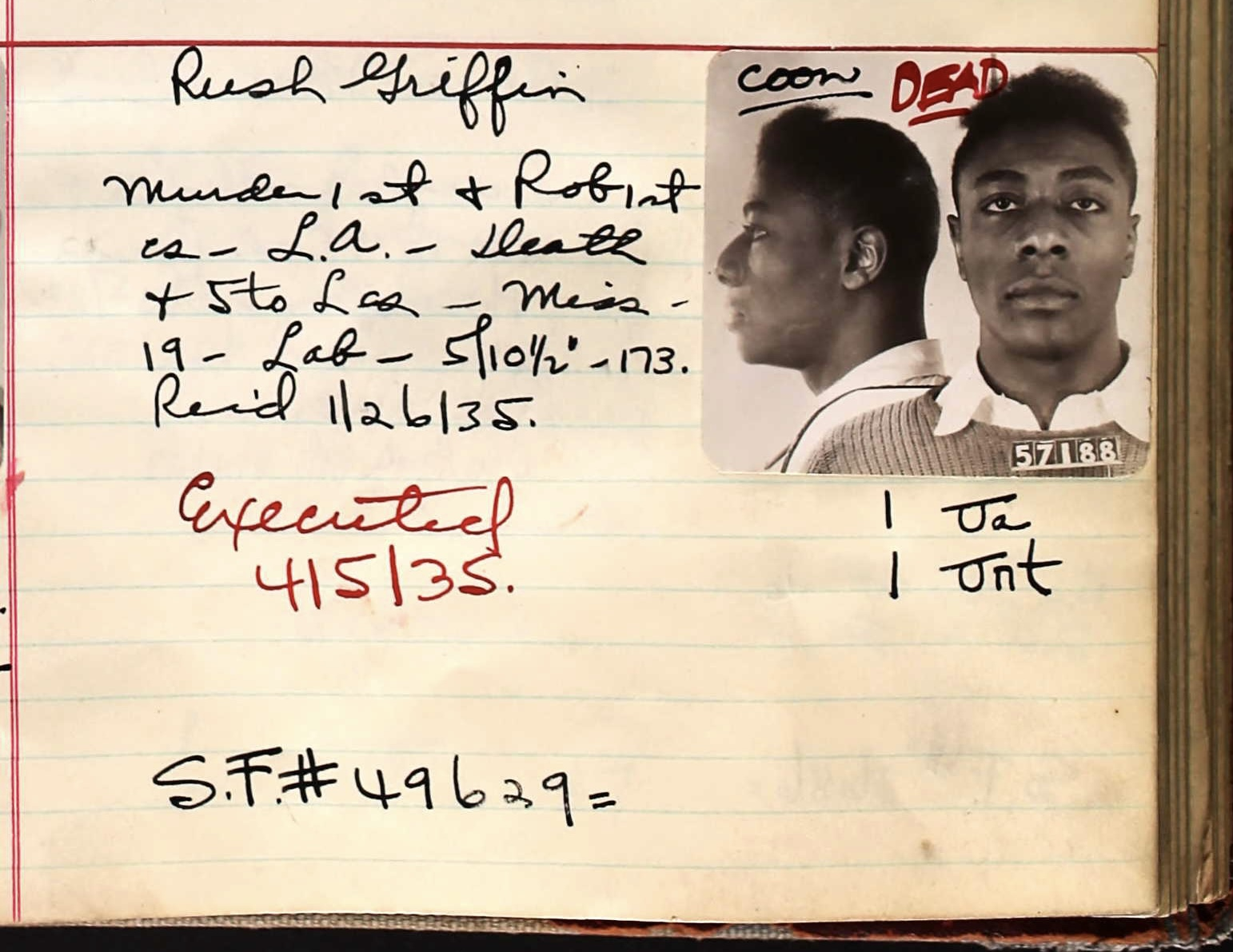
Griffin's prison record book

Rush Griffin (c. 1916, Mississippi – April 5, 1935) was an American convicted killer who was executed at San Quentin State Prison in California despite the fact that a stay of execution had been issued by a court.

Griffin and Willie Smith had both confessed to the killing of USC Medical School student Laurence Lyon during an attempted robbery on November 12, 1934, at "9th and Hemlock" or Ninth and Central. Griffin was sentenced to death and hanged on the San Quentin gallows on April 5, 1935. The execution came to be known as the "error hanging". The clerk responsible for failing to correctly process the appeal documents and court communications for the prison warden was suspended for 30 days without pay.

According to an article by Judge Arthur Alarcón, as a result of Griffin's execution without full due process, a California legislative "committee recommended that legislation be enacted providing for an automatic appeal in all cases where the trial court ordered a sentence of death. As a result, section 1239 was amended to provide that '[w]hen...a judgment of death is rendered, an appeal is automatically taken by the defendant.' The right to an automatic appeal 'imposes a duty upon [the] court 'to make an examination of the complete record of the proceedings had in the trial court, to the end that it be ascertained whether defendant was given a fair trial.' The court 'cannot avoid or abdicate this duty merely because defendant desires to waive the right provided for him'."

== See also ==
- Capital punishment in California
- Elizabeth "Harriot" Wilson
- List of people executed in the United States in 1935
