= Alonzo Robinson =

American grave robber, murderer, cannibal, and suspected serial killer

- Born: 1895; Cleveland, Mississippi, U.S.
- Died: March 5, 1935 (aged 39–40); Bolivar County Jail, Cleveland, Mississippi, U.S.
- Cause of death: Execution by hanging
- Other name: James H. Coyner
- Height: 6 ft 4 in (193 cm)
- Conviction: Murder
- Penalty: Death

Details
- Victims: 2–6
- Span of crimes: 1926–1934
- Country: United States
- States: Michigan, Mississippi
- Date apprehended: January 12, 1935

Alonzo Robinson (1895 – March 5, 1935), also known as James H. Coyner, was an American grave robber, murderer, cannibal and suspected serial killer. While living at a house in Ferndale, Michigan, Robinson was suspected of murdering and decapitating 4 women, but there was insufficient evidence to convict him. He was eventually sentenced to death and executed for murdering Aurelius B. Turner and his wife, Louella Turner, in his hometown of Cleveland.

== Biography ==
Born into an impoverished family in Cleveland, Mississippi, Robinson was first arrested by hometown authorities in 1918 for mailing obscene letters to local women. He managed to escape while en route to the jail, sustaining a bullet injury to his shoulder in the process.

Using the alias of "James H. Coyner", Robinson moved to Ferndale, Michigan sometime in 1926. Around this time, the bodies of decapitated women had started turning up around the city, with the authorities immediately suspecting Robinson. By 1927, he had been convicted and imprisoned at the Indiana State Prison in Michigan City for stealing a girl's corpse from a local graveyard. While imprisoned, he was questioned by Ferndale authorities about the case, but he simply stated:

"I could tell you a lot of things you'd like to know, a lot of things about murders and murderers, but I'll die first."

After being paroled in June 1934, he returned to Cleveland and continued writing obscene letters. One of them was mailed to a woman in Indianapolis, and while it was being investigated by postal inspectors, Robinson had already murdered two more people.

=== Murder of the Turners ===
On December 9, 1934, Robinson broke into the Cleveland home of Aurelius Burns Turner and his pregnant wife, Eunice Louella Turner (née Sherrill). While Mr. Turner was sitting in a chair and reading a newspaper, he was hit with an axe by Robinson before being shot. Mrs. Turner was then hit approximately five times with the axe, before he mutilated both of their bodies and kept some of the woman's flesh. He also reportedly struck one of the Turners' children over the head and left the child for dead but did not harm the other child, who was sleeping in a crib.

== Arrest and confession ==
Shortly after the murders, Robinson was arrested on January 12, 1935, by authorities in Shaw, Mississippi after they were able to trace his letters to his post office box. He instinctively grabbed his gun, but the deputies quickly overpowered him and he surrendered. The policemen then proceeded to search his pockets, finding more obscene letters and Mr. Turner's pocket watch, but also a packet of human hair in Mrs. Turner's color and portions of human flesh complete with bite marks, which were salted and cured.

Following his arrest, Robinson was moved to a jail in Hinds County. While there, he was questioned for several hours in his cell by District Attorney Greek Rice, along with Sheriffs E. R. McLean and John Roberts, freely confessing to killing the Turners because he "had an impulse to kill somebody". He was also questioned about the trunk with the missing women's heads found in Ferndale as requested by authorities in Pontiac, and although Robinson claimed that the trunk was indeed his, he denied killing the women, and instead claimed that they were trophies from various grave robbing expeditions.

== Trial, sentence and death ==
Following his confessions, Robinson was brought to court for his trial. Due to the gruesome nature of his crimes, heavy patrols, organized by the Mississippi National Guard, were placed both in the streets and in the court room. He was speedily convicted and sentenced to death by the judge following a one-day trial, subsequently being sent to a jail in Jackson for safekeeping with an escort of 200 National Guardsmen.

On March 5, 1935, in the Bolivar County jail, between 200 and 300 troops guarded the premises as Sheriff McLean was preparing the prisoner for the execution. Grinning broadly as the black hood and noose were pulled over his head, Alonzo Robinson was executed by hanging on the jail's scaffold.

== See also ==
- List of serial killers in the United States

== Bibliography ==
- Hunter Cole (2012). The Legs Murder Scandal. Univ. Press of Mississippi. p. 62. ISBN 978-1604737233.
- Michael Newton: The Encyclopedia of Serial Killers, 2000
