= Michael Malloy =

Irish-American murder victim (1873–1933)

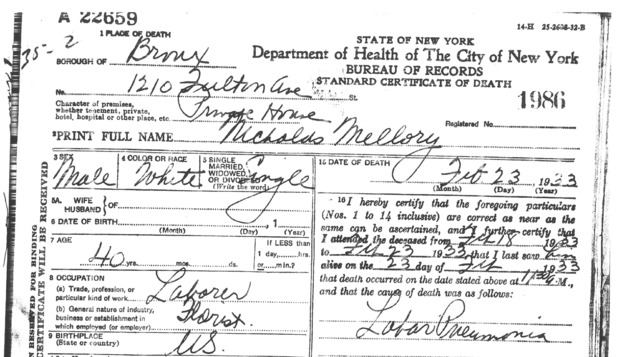
- Improper death certificate by Dr. Frank Manzella for Michael Malloy
- Born: 1873; County Donegal, Ireland
- Died: February 22, 1933 (aged 59–60); The Bronx, New York, U.S.
- Cause of death: Carbon monoxide poisoning
- Resting place: Ferncliff Cemetery and Mausoleum
- Other names: Mike the Durable; Iron Mike; Iron Mike Malloy; Irish Rasputin; The Juggernaut
- Occupations: Firefighter; Stationary engineer

Michael Malloy (1873 – February 22, 1933), nicknamed Mike the Durable or Iron Mike, was a homeless Irishman from County Donegal who lived in New York City during the 1920s and 1930s. A former firefighter and stationary engineer, he was murdered by a group of five acquaintances after multiple failed attempts on his life by the men to perpetrate life insurance fraud.

== Background ==
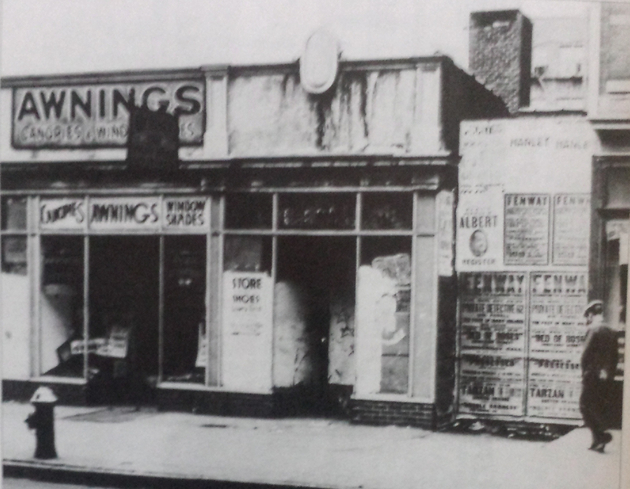
Marino's speakeasy on Third Avenue, New York City

Beginning in January 1933, while Malloy was unemployed, alcoholic, and homeless, five of his acquaintances – Tony Marino, Joseph "Red" Murphy, Francis Pasqua, Hershey Green, and Daniel Kriesberg (later dubbed "the Murder Trust" by the media) – plotted to kill Malloy by getting him to drink himself to death to collect life insurance. Presumably achieved with the aid of a corrupt insurance agent, they obtained insurance policies on Malloy's life under the name Nicholas Mellory and stood to gain over US$3,500 (equivalent to $87,050 in 2025) if Malloy died an accidental death.

== Failed murder attempts ==
Tony Marino owned a speakeasy and gave Malloy an unlimited tab, thinking the alcoholic Malloy would abuse it and drink himself to death. Although Malloy drank for a majority of his waking day, it did not kill him. Marino then added antifreeze to Malloy's liquor, but Malloy would continue to drink with no problems. A possible explanation for the antifreeze not killing him is the fact that ethanol blocks absorption of ethylene glycol in the liver (and is used as one possible antidote for antifreeze poisoning). Antifreeze was replaced with turpentine, followed by horse liniment, and finally rat poison was mixed in. After these mixtures failed to kill Malloy, Marino mixed shots of wood alcohol in with his normal shots of liquor. This did not kill Malloy, presumably because the normal liquor helped negate the methanol poisoning.

The group then gave Malloy raw oysters soaked in wood alcohol – the idea apparently coming from Pasqua, who claimed he saw a man die after eating oysters with whiskey. A sandwich of spoiled sardines mixed with poison and carpet tacks was then tried.

Concluding that it was unlikely that anything Malloy ingested was going to kill him quickly enough before the insurance policies ran out, the group decided to freeze him to death. On an extremely cold night, after Malloy drank until passing out, he was carried to a park, dumped in the snow, and had 5 US gallons (19 L; 4.2 imp gal) of water poured on his bare chest. However, shortly thereafter, Malloy was rescued by police who took him to a homeless charity where he was re-clothed.

The group then attempted to kill Malloy by running him down with Green's taxi, moving at 45 miles per hour (72 km/h). This put Malloy in the hospital for three weeks with broken bones. The group presumed he was dead, but they were unable to collect the policy on him.

== Murder and legal proceedings ==
On February 22, 1933, after he had passed out for the night, the conspirators took Malloy to Murphy's room, put a hose in his mouth that was connected to the coal gas jet, and turned it on. This finally killed Malloy, with his death occurring within an hour. He was pronounced dead of lobar pneumonia and quickly buried, with Dr. Frank Manzella signing the death certificate. Police heard rumors of "Mike the Durable" in speakeasies around the town, and upon learning that Michael Malloy had died that night, they had the body exhumed and forensically examined.

The five men were put on trial and subsequently convicted. Dr. Manzella was held as an accessory after the fact with a US$10,000 bail (equivalent to $248,715 in 2025), but was ultimately convicted of a misdemeanor in "failing to report a suspicious death to the police and Medical Examiner". Green was convicted of attempted murder with a prison sentence of a minimum of 10 years, while the other four accomplices were sentenced to death and were executed by electric chair at Sing Sing in Ossining, New York. Kriesberg, Marino, and Pasqua were executed on June 7, 1934, and Murphy was executed on July 5, 1934.

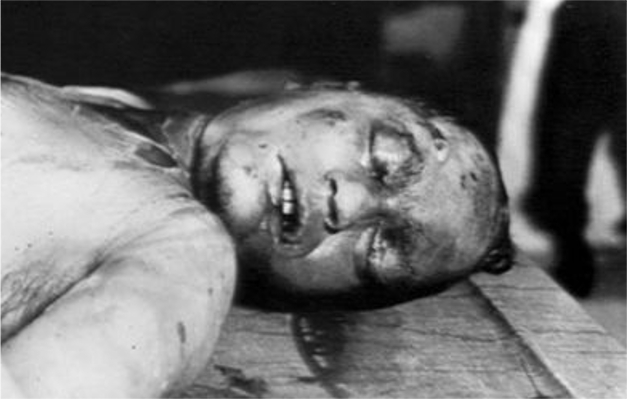
Malloy's body, during his autopsy

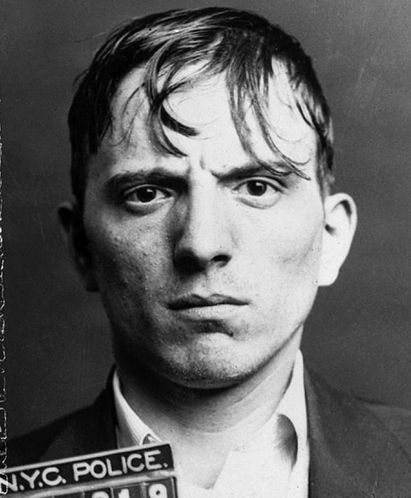
Marino's mug shot

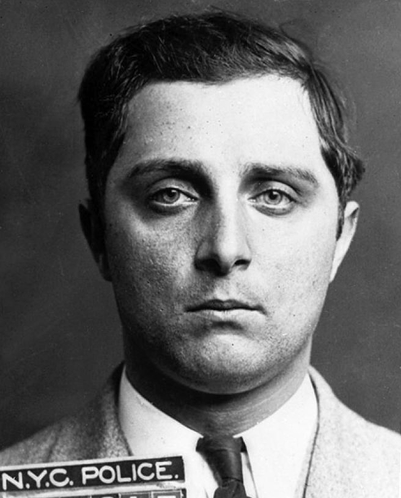
Pasqua's mug shot

== In popular culture ==
- Episodes of the radio drama Yours Truly, Johnny Dollar - The Indestructible Mike Matter originally broadcast on June 6, 7, and 8, 1956, starring Bob Bailey and Howard McNear (as Mike Flynn), are based on the case.
- A 1986 episode of Amazing Stories, called "One for the Road", is a fictionalized version of this incident, in which a group of friends conspire to kill a drunk named Mike Malloy for insurance money.
- Alternative rock band Primus included the Matt Winegar-penned instrumental (which Winegar also performed) "You Can't Kill Michael Malloy" for their 1990 album, Frizzle Fry.
- A 2015 episode of True Nightmares, produced by Wilma TV/Discovery Channel Season 2, Episode 3 "Friends Like These", is a telling of the story of Michael Malloy and his murder.
- The jazz musical "The Man Who Wouldn't be Murdered" is based on Malloy's story.
- The song "That Man Malloy" by Celtic folk trio House of Hamill recounts the story of Malloy's murder.
- A 1983 short story from the book "Palabra mágica / Magic word" written by Augusto Monterroso called "Las ilusiones perdidas/ The lost illusions" is a fictionalized version of this incident, in which a group of friends conspire to kill a drunk named Mike Malloy for insurance money.
- In 2025 Malloy's story was adapted for the stage by writer/director Luke Adamson in "The Unkillable Mike Malloy".
- Malloy's story was adapted into the musical 'Yield Not to Evil', produced by the Abernethy Bennett Company and had its debut concert performances in September 2025

== See also ==
- List of unusual deaths in the 20th century
- Grigori Rasputin (1869–1916) – a Russian mystic and self-proclaimed holy man, assassinated by a group of conservative noblemen who opposed his influence in late imperial Russia
- Angelina Rodriguez (born 1968) – an American woman, sentenced to life in prison for the murder of her fourth husband after taking out a US$250,000 life insurance policy on him
