= Romasanta (name) =

Romasanta is a Spanish surname. Notable people with the name include:

- Joey Romasanta (born 1944), Filipino sports executive and president of the Philippine Olympic Committee
- Manuel Blanco Romasanta (né Manuela; 1809–1863), Spain's first recorded serial killer

== See also ==
- Romasanta, a film based on Manuel Romasanta
