= Juan Díaz de Garayo =

Spanish serial killer

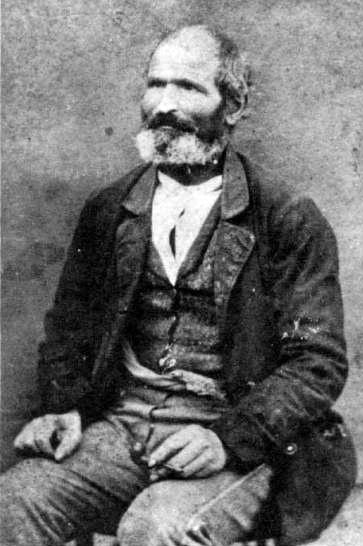
- Born: Juan Díaz de Garayo y Ruiz de Argandoña; 17 October 1821; Eguilaz, Álava, Spain
- Died: 11 May 1881 (aged 59); Vitoria, Álava, Spain
- Cause of death: Garrote
- Other names: El Sacamantecas (The Fat Extractor); Zurrumbón
- Conviction: Murder
- Penalty: Two death penalties

Details
- Victims: 6 murders and 4 attempts
- Span of crimes: 1870–1879
- Country: Spain
- Date apprehended: 1879

Juan Díaz de Garayo y Ruiz de Argandoña, also known as "The Sacamantecas" ("The fat extractor" in Spanish) (17 October 1821 – 11 May 1881), was a Spanish serial killer active near Vitoria, Álava, who strangled five women and a 13-year-old girl, and attacked four other women during two different periods, 1870 to 1874 and 1878 to 1879. A lust-motivated serial killer, Garayo's first victims were sex workers, who he murdered after supposedly hiring them for their sexual services. Later on, as he became more opportunistic and willing to take risks, he also murdered women who he happened to see walking alone in the country. His last two victims, murdered in consecutive days, were also stabbed, and the second was disembowelled.

Garayo's persona and crimes were the subject of El Sacamantecas, an 1881 monograph written by Ricardo Becerro de Bengoa, who visited Garayo while he was in prison awaiting execution.

== Early life and family ==
Garayo was born on 17 October 1821, the ninth child of farmers Nicolás Díaz de Garayo and Norberta Ruiz de Argandoña, in Eguilaz, a village near the town of Salvatierra in Álava, Basque Country, Spain. He was illiterate, (having never received an education), hard-working, and austere. Between the murders, he lived and worked in Vitoria as usual, attracting no suspicion.

At age 14, during the First Carlist War, Garayo was sent by his parents to serve in the neighbouring towns of Salvatierra, Alaiza, Ocáriz, Izarza, Añua and Alegría-Dulantzi, where he worked temporally as a farmhand, shepherd, and coal miner. In 1850 he began to serve Antonia Berrosteguieta, a widow from Vitoria who was looking for a servant with experience in farming and field management. Shortly thereafter, he and Berrosteguieta married. Berrosteguieta was nicknamed La Zurrumbona after her first husband, who had been known as Zurrumbón, a nickname that Garayo would inherit.

The couple had five children, three of whom (Cándido, Josefa and Tomás) survived. This marriage ended in 1863 with the death of La Zurrumbona, and Garayo married his second wife, Juana Salazar, shortly after. Unlike the first marriage, which was happy, the second was loaded with conflict between his new wife and her stepchildren. His eldest son left to serve in a house and the other two increasingly spent their time in the street away from the family home. Salazar died from smallpox in 1870 and Garayo committed his first murder shortly after. Garayo married a third time, again shortly after the death of his previous wife, and this marriage was even more plagued by conflict, as the woman was an alcoholic. After only five years of marriage, in 1876, Garayo found his wife bedridden and in agony upon returning from work; he called for a doctor but was told that nothing could be done about it. She died, and one month later he married his fourth and final wife, an elderly widow named Juana Ibisate.

Although the relationship with his later wives wasn't idyllic, there is no evidence that Garayo had any part in their deaths. When asked about the most suspicious, the third, the imprisoned Garayo declared:

"No; I did not kill her, because if I had I would have declared it, as I have done with the others."

== Murders ==
=== First spree ===
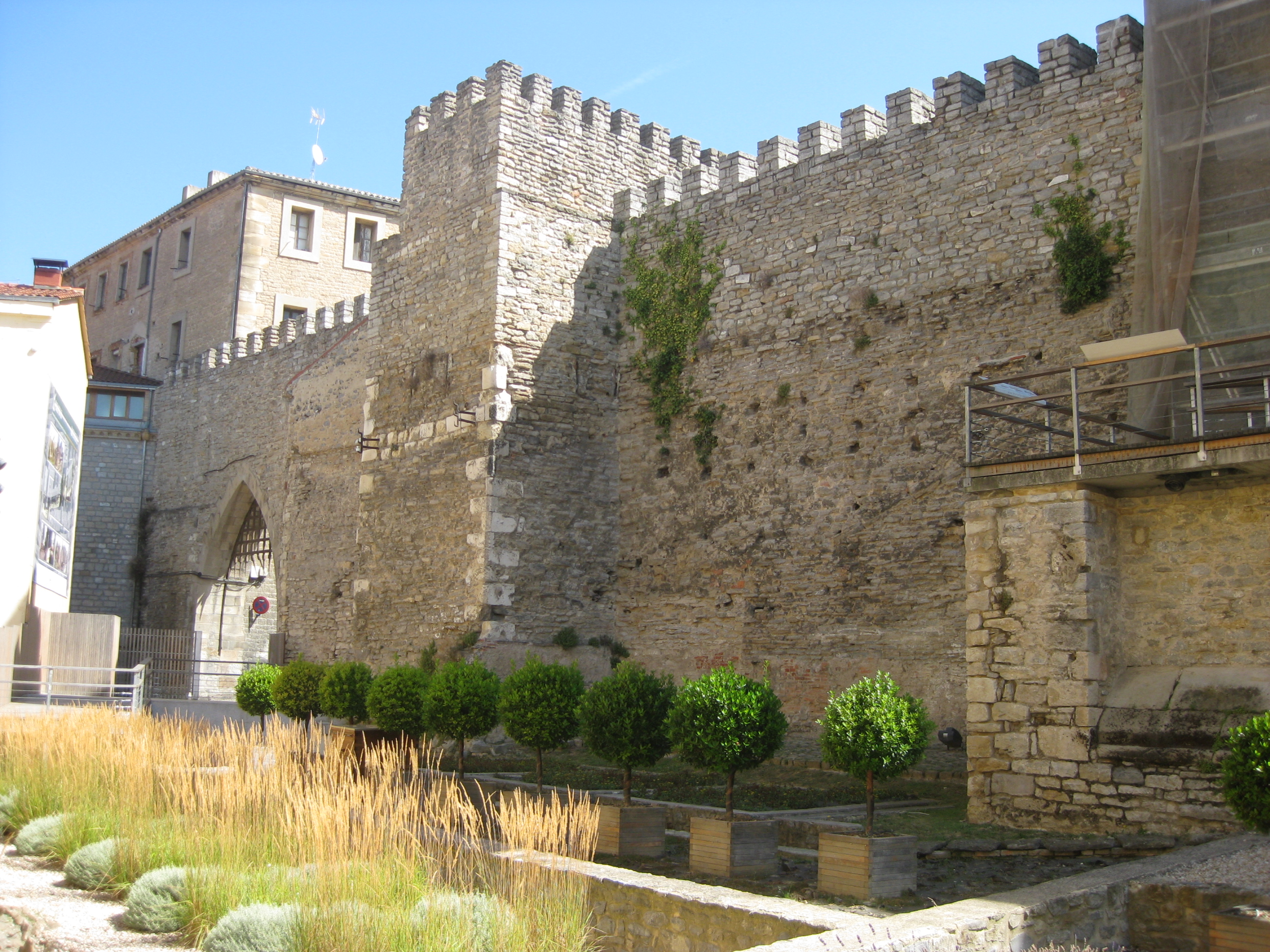
Medieval walls of Vitoria

Garayo's first victim was a well-known woman from Vitoria who had turned to prostitution while her husband was in jail, and he hired her on the afternoon of 2 April 1870. The two walked out of the city through the Portal del Rey, took the road to Navarre, and stopped by the Recachiqui (Errekatxiki) stream to have sex. Once done Garayo offered her three Spanish reales and she protested for finding it too short. Garayo offered one more real but she demanded five. At this point, Garayo threw her to the ground and oppressed her throat with both hands until she became unconscious. He then took his victim to the stream and submerged her head in the water until she drowned. Garayo then undressed the body and placed it face up on the ground. He sat next to the body for a while before covering it with the clothes and returned to the city during the night. The murder was discovered the next morning by a servant who was picking flowers by the bankside and alerted the authorities, but the case was archived for lack of evidence shortly after.

The second murder was committed on 12 March 1871, also during the afternoon. Garayo met a poor widow begging in Portal del Rey and offered her to come with him. After she said that she had not eaten that day, Garayo gave her one real and told her to not get late, saying that he would be waiting for her on the road to Navarre. The woman bought bread and a glass of wine in an inn and the two walked the road to a place known as Labizcarra, 400 metres from the Recachiqui, where they had sex. Once again, Garayo offered a short sum, the woman protested and he brought her down and strangled her with his hands, returning home at night. The body was discovered the next day but once again the investigators found no lead to the culprit.

The third occurred on 21 August 1872. This time the murder was at noon and the victim wasn't a prostitute. Garayo was travelling to Gamarra Mayor when he met a 13-year-old servant girl walking in the opposite direction, who had been sent on an errand to Vitoria by her employers. Garayo seized her and hauled her off the road, oppressing her throat until she became unconscious, and raped her. He strangled her again until she died and hid the body in a ditch, returning to Vitoria by 2 pm. The discovery of the murder the next day caused a great commotion in Vitoria and its region. However, the doubled efforts of the investigators met again with a lack of leads, and even worse, with news of another murder only 8 days later, on 29 August.

At dusk, Garayo approached a 23-year-old woman not far from his own home, whom he knew to be lewd, and offered her money for sex. The two left this time by the Portal de Barreras and advanced through the road to La Rioja, Garayo walking a distance behind her to prevent people from seeing them together. They reunited after a while and had sex next to a bridge. Garayo offered her two reales and after she protested, three and then four. She kept demanding more and he brought her down and strangled her until he thought she was dead. The victim, however, made a slight movement. Garayo then took her hairpin, straightened it, and stabbed her in the heart while holding her body under his knees. He placed the body next to the river and went back home during the night. The police investigated a soldier destined for Vitoria (the Third Carlist War had just broken out), but he was found innocent and cleared of suspicion. The panic among the population increased, with many women refusing to go outside alone and villages becoming deserted at night.

In August 1873, again during an afternoon, Garayo took another prostitute to the Recachiqui. Again he offered little money, she protested and he attempted to strangle her, but the woman could scream and alert some guards from Polvorín Viejo – the prison where Garayo would be executed later – forcing him to flee.

In June 1874, Garayo happened upon an old, sickly beggar woman on the road of La Zumaquera. Without saying a word, Garayo attempted to strangle her, but she screamed and defended herself until two other women arrived and Garayo ran away. The victim identified Garayo and said that he was drunk and had tried to kill her for no reason, but nobody informed the police.

=== Hiatus and possible imitators ===
Díaz de Garayo would not act for four years after the second unsuccessful attempt. It was believed at the time of his execution, however, that his murders had inspired others to commit crimes in the Basque region:

- On 2 January 1878, six years after the last successful murder, a 55-year-old woman was killed on the way back from Arechavaleta, where she had gone to buy wine. The murder was far more gruesome than any of the ones committed by Garayo: the victim was stabbed repeatedly in the chest and belly, disembowelled, and her right hand was severed.
- On 28 February, in the very same Vitoria, a 75-year-old man knocked on a house's door and when an 11-year-old girl opened it, he seized, raped and stabbed her several times in the belly with a razor, before abandoning the weapon and fleeing. The girl was hospitalized and identified her aggressor three times before dying on 3 March. The man recognized the razor found as his own but denied having done the crime. He was found guilty of the last crime, but there was no evidence to link him to the others, and was sentenced to 20 years in prison which the Supreme Court of Spain overturned and changed to death penalty. He was garroted in Vitoria on 19 May 1880.
- Right around that time, another woman was murdered in the countryside around Vitoria. The prime suspect was a shepherd seen in the city shortly before, who could not be found nor apprehended.

=== Second spree ===
On 1 November 1878, Garayo visited a mill outside Vitoria that he had been previously to and found the female miller cooking alone. After some words, he tried to strangle her but Garayo, 57 at the time, was overpowered by the woman and forced to flee. She denounced him and Garayo was arrested and sentenced to two months in prison.

On 25 August 1879, Garayo left Vitoria through the road to Castile. Between the villages of Gomecha and Aríñez, he found an old beggar woman and offered her alms. He then pushed her off the road; she fell and hurt her head on a rock. However, when Garayo jumped over her, she kicked him in the belly and he fell backwards. The woman got up and ran to Vitoria, screaming. Garayo followed her from a distance, and arriving in Vitoria he asked his fourth wife to speak with the woman and reach an agreement that would keep him out of jail. The victim wanted to denounce him but eventually agreed not to in exchange for 20 pesetas (80 reales). Until the woman was convinced, Garayo cautiously left the city and looked for work in the Somorrostro mines, in Biscay.

On the way back to Vitoria, on September 7, he latched to a 25-year-old woman from Zaitegui, María Dolores Cortázar, who had worked as a maid in Vitoria and began to converse with her. Once he was sure that no one else was around (a mail service employee had passed them and seen them talking together), he pushed her off the road, took her handkerchief and tied it to her neck, asking for sex and promising discretion and money in return. As the victim kept resisting, he threatened her and finally stabbed her multiple times in the chest with a razor. He raped her and then stabbed her in the belly again until she died.

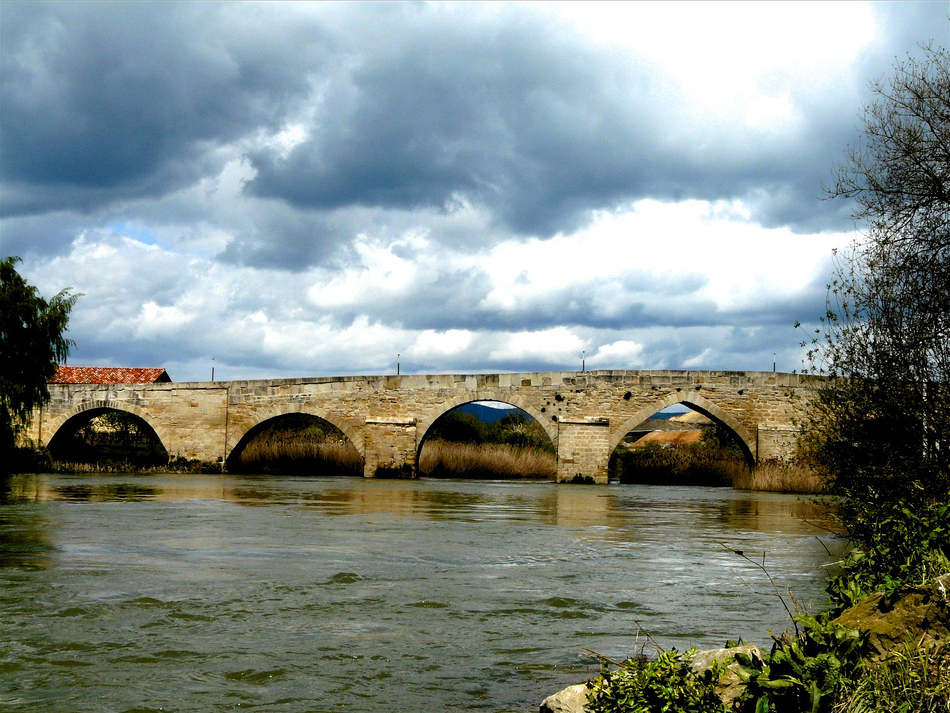
Bridge over the Zadorra river

Garayo hid the body and the food basket that the victim had been transporting, but rather than continuing to Vitoria he took a detour through the mountains where he was seen by a farmer looking for a cow, drank in a road inn called "Venta del Grillo", and slept under a bridge on the Zadorra River, in the vicinity of Arriaga. He woke up at dawn and had breakfast in an inn of Arriaga, but once again, instead of continuing to Vitoria, he returned to the bridge, left the road and climbed the hill of Araca. There he happened upon a 52-year-old farmer woman from Navarrete, Manuela Audícana, who had come to Vitoria for the festival and was going back home with some food she had bought. The two conversed until it began to rain, and sought refuge beneath a tree. Garayo, who had claimed at first to be looking for a lost mare, confessed his true intentions and the woman attempted to flee, but he seized her and strangled her with her own apron. He took off all her clothes but found himself unable to perform. As the woman was still breathing, he stabbed her in the heart and the belly with the same razor used in the previous crime, then cut the belly open and extracted the intestines and a kidney. He cleaned the blood on his hands with the victim's clothing, covered the body, ate the food in her basket, and slept again under the same bridge. In the morning, he threw the razor in the river and cleaned himself before returning to Vitoria at last, changing clothes and leaving almost immediately for Alegría. The two bodies were discovered that day.

== Arrest ==
=== 1879 crime investigation ===
The investigation of this last double murder was conducted by Judge José Antonio de Parada and involved Police agents in Vitoria and Guardia Civil in the nearby region. The Guardia Civil commander at Murguía (Zuia) heard the testimony of the mail service employee who had seen the first victim walking with a man and interrogated the inn patrons and farmers of the region who claimed to have seen a stranger with the same aspect around that time. This description was sent back to Vitoria where the Alguacil Pío Fernández de Pinedo linked it to Garayo and his recent arrest for the attack on the miller. Pinedo also learned of the unsuccessful attack in August, from the victim, and shared his suspicions with Parada, who formalized the case against Juan Díaz de Garayo.

Pinedo took the arrest order to Garayo's home, where Garayo's wife said that he had left after the incident with the old woman and she had not seen him since (in reality, she had seen him briefly when he came to change clothes on September 9), that she did not know of his current whereabouts or the reason he had hurt the other woman. Garayo was at this time serving in the house of a farmer in Alegría, where news of the last crimes arrived shortly after Garayo did so himself. The farmer's daughter, a young child, reportedly told her father that the new servant was "so ugly", he "looked like the Sacamantecas".

=== Arrest, trial and conviction ===
Garayo returned unexpectedly to Vitoria on 21 September and was arrested and taken to the local jail after being recognized on the street by Pinedo. There he was interrogated by Parada, but Garayo denied everything. He remained in jail for 12 days, this time being interrogated by warden José Fresco and key holder Juan Giménez, and only admitted guilt and began to describe the crimes after they appealed to his religious beliefs and convinced him that it was the only way to obtain Divine Mercy. He started with the murder of the Zaitegui woman, which was transcribed by Giménez, and later described the Araca murder to Giménez and Fresco. On 3 October he agreed to repeat this testimony before the judge and his notaries, and he did so from 9:00 pm to 3:00 am adding further details. The next day he confessed to the four other murders and four attempts to Fresco and Giménez. On 11 November, Parada sentenced Garayo to two death penalties and to give economic compensation, though only for the two last murders. Garayo remained calm when he received the sentence and asked lawyers Manuel Lete and Juan Echavarría to sign the sentences in his name, as he was illiterate. He then asked Giménez for a stew, as he had not eaten meat that day, which he conceded. From his conviction, Garayo wore shackles on his feet and was denied a shaving razor. He managed to shave himself with a lighted match at least once but grew his beard afterwards. Garayo also learned to read in the jail's library.

=== Appeal ===
Garayo's defence appealed the conviction to the Audiencia of Burgos, arguing insanity on the part of the defendant, and this ordered the court of Vitoria to have Garayo's mental state evaluated by as many doctors as possible, as well as to interrogate all of his friends and relatives on this matter. 11 Vitoria doctors were consulted, who determined on a report (3 March 1880) that Garayo was not insane and had committed the crimes consciously. The defence asked for a second report, this time to the directors of the mental hospitals in Carabanchel Alto (Madrid) and Toledo, who on 24 May found Garayo to be "imbecile" and to have committed the crimes under the influence of a "partial madness" or "intermittent monomania, amidst long intervals of lucidity". However, the Supreme Court disregarded the appeal and maintained the sentence.

=== Execution ===
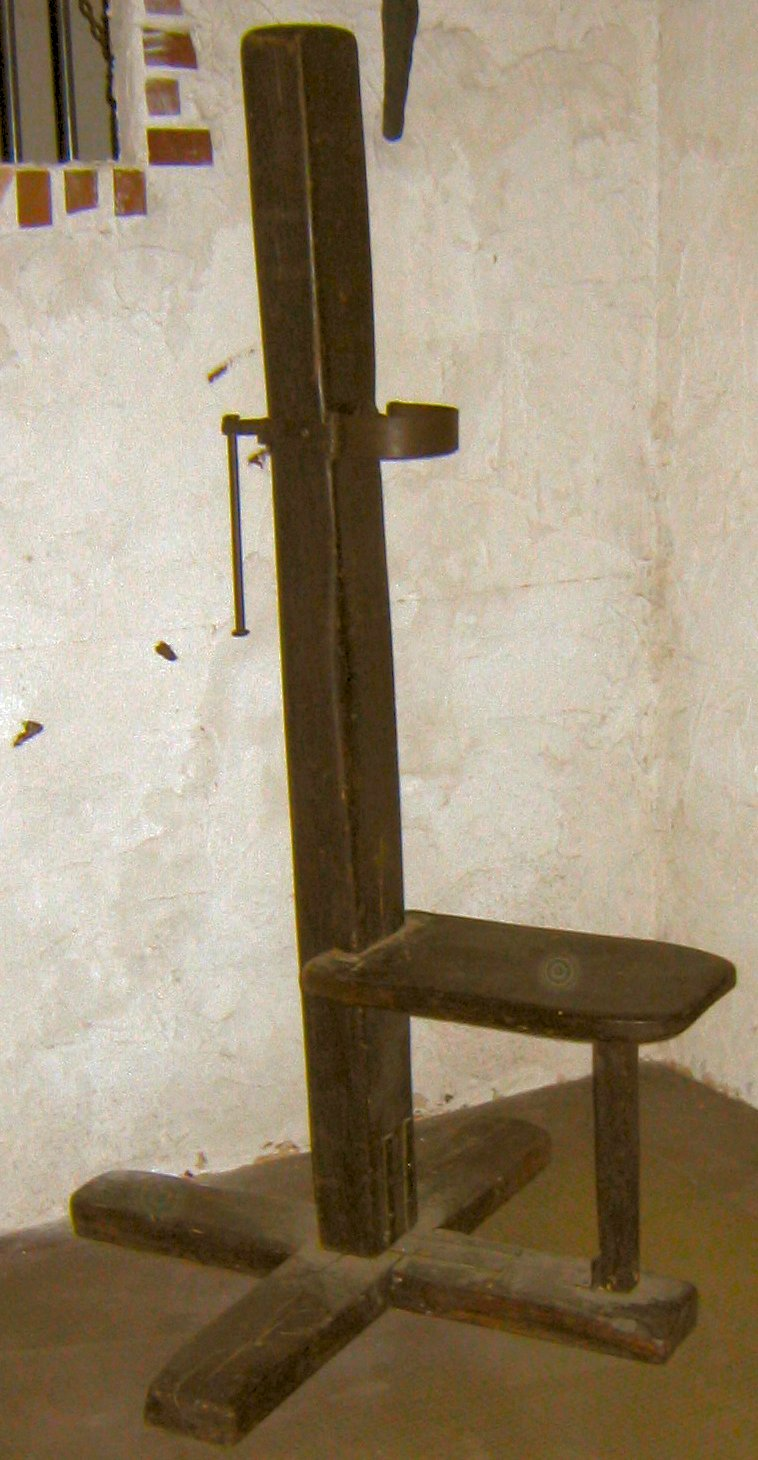
A garrote.

Juan Díaz de Garayo was garroted at the Polvorín Viejo prison of Vitoria on 11 May 1881, by executioner Lorenzo Huertas, who came from Burgos. After his death, Garayo's body was exposed publicly for ten hours and buried at an unmarked grave in Santa Isabel cemetery, but the head is believed to have been separated during the autopsy, sold to a medical collection in Madrid and eventually lost.

== The Sacamantecas nickname ==
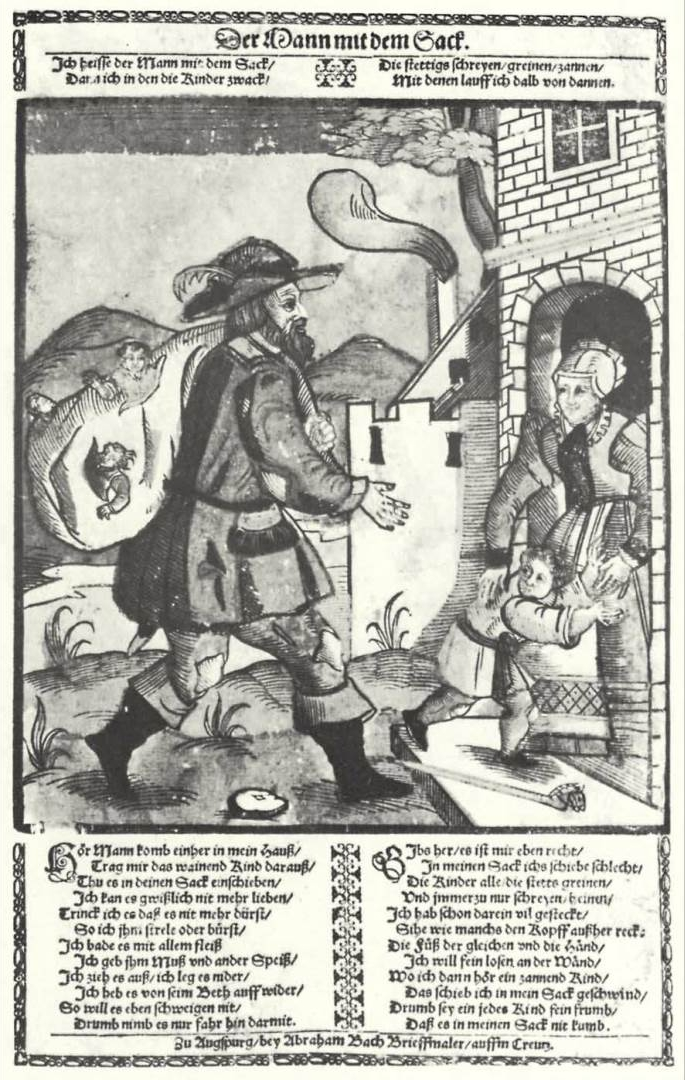
Representation of a sack man

In Spanish folklore, the Sacamantecas (Spanish for "Fat Extractor") is a bogeyman-type character, often conflated with the child-targeting sack man, that abducts people to extract their body fat and sell it. Juan Díaz de Garayo was called The Sacamantecas upon his arrest and conviction, and today is sometimes referred to as "the real" Sacamantecas, but he wasn't the origin of this legendary character, as it predates him, nor did he ever extract the body fat of his victims.

The idea that the murders were the work of a Sacamantecas was actually a popular rumour that began prior to Garayo's arrest when there was no known culprit. Garayo himself heard of this rumour, and his disembowelment of the last victim was a deliberate attempt to promote it. In the legends, the Sacamantecas were wandering traders, always outsiders, while Garayo was a local farmer. Through this attempt to "confirm" the Sacamantecas rumour, Garayo tried to throw suspicion off himself and the real reason for the murders, his sexual impulses.

Though only Garayo came to be known as "The" Sacamantecas, other serial killers and child murderers in 19th and early 20th century Spain were claimed to be sacamantecas as well, such as Manuel Blanco Romasanta, Enriqueta Martí i Ripollés and the 1910 murderers of the Sierra de Gádor.

== In fiction ==
Juan Díaz de Garayo is mentioned in Pío Baroja's 1932 novel La Familia de Errotabo, where he is incorrectly claimed to have been the first person executed by Gregorio Mayoral (1863–1928), historical executioner prominent in Restoration Spain who garroted Michele Angiolillo, the murderer of Spanish Prime Minister Cánovas del Castillo in 1897, among others. Mayoral's first execution actually took place in 1892.

Garayo himself appears as a main character in Tomás Salvador's novel Cuerda de Presos, winner of Spain's National Prize for Literature in 1953, and its 1956 film adaptation by Pedro Lazaga. The story relates the fictional arrest of Garayo in León and his travel back to Vitoria while being guarded by two Guardia Civil officers. In real life, Garayo never left the Basque Country.

== See also ==
- List of serial killers before 1900
- List of serial killers by country
- Spain under the Restoration
