= The Boogeyman: The Origin of the Myth =

2023 film directed by Ángel Gómez Hernández

- Film poster
- Spanish: El hombre del saco
- Directed by: Ángel Gómez Hernández
- Screenplay by: Juma Fodde
- Produced by: Álvaro Ariza; María Luisa Gutiérrez; Ignacio G. Cucucovich
- Starring: Javier Botet; Macarena Gómez; Manolo Solo; Iván Renedo; Claudia Placer; Lorca Prada; Carla Tous; Lucas de Blas; Guillermo Novillo
- Cinematography: Javier Salmones
- Edited by: Luis de la Madrid
- Music by: Jesús Díaz
- Production companies: Esto también pasará; Mother Superior Films; Bowfinger International Pictures
- Distributed by: Filmax
- Release date: 11 August 2023 (Spain)
- Countries: Spain; Uruguay
- Language: Spanish

The Boogeyman: The Origin of the Myth (Spanish: El hombre del saco) is a 2023 teen fantasy horror film directed by Ángel Gómez Hernández from a screenplay by Juma Fodde which stars Javier Botet as the title character alongside Macarena Gómez and Manolo Solo. It is inspired by the crime of Gádor.

== Plot ==
Set in Gádor, the plot begins with the arrival to the town of a widow and her three children, exploring the story of the disappearance of several children and the myth of the Sack Man (hombre del saco).

== Cast ==
- Javier Botet as el hombre del saco ('Sack Man')
- Macarena Gómez as Claudia
- Manolo Solo as Aguirre
- Iván Renedo as Lucas
- Claudia Placer as Alicia
- Lorca Prada as Sergio
- Carla Tous as Paula
- Lucas de Blas as Alex
- Guillermo Novillo as Gabi
- Luna Fulgencio as Sara

== Production ==
The film is a Spanish-Uruguayan co-production by Esto también pasará, Mother Superior Films, and Bowfinger International Pictures in association with BTF Media and Glow, with the participation of Atresmedia, Prime Video, Canal Sur, Crea SGR and backing from INCAU and ANDE. While set in Gádor (province of Almería), the film was shot in the province of Cádiz, Madrid, and Gran Canaria.

== Release ==
The film was released theatrically in Spain on 11 August 2023 by Filmax.

== Reception ==
Raquel Hernández Luján of HobbyConsolas rated the film with 45 points ('bad'), decrying how Solo's and Gómez's talents were wasted, and how the film neared involuntary comedy territory more than once.

Santiago Alverú of Cinemanía rated the film 2½ out of 5 stars, pointing out that the film is not scary, recalling that, as Oogie Boogie sang in The Nightmare Before Christmas, "if you aren't shaking, there's something [very] wrong", while positively mentioning that "Guillermo Novillo is a great actor" in his verdict.

== See also ==
- List of Spanish films of 2023
