= Frank Agullo =

American plastic surgeon

- Education: Universidad Anáhuac México (MD, 2001)
- Known for: Plastic and reconstructive surgery
- Board member of: American Board of Plastic Surgery; American Board of Surgery
- Awards: Castle Connolly Top Doctor
- Medical career
- Institutions: Southwest Plastic Surgery; Texas Tech University Health Sciences Center Paul L. Foster School of Medicine; University of Texas at El Paso
- Website: swplasticsurgery.com

Francisco J. Agullo is an American plastic surgeon born in San Juan, Puerto Rico, and based in El Paso, Texas. He is a Fellow of the American College of Surgeons (FACS) and the founder and medical director of Southwest Plastic Surgery in El Paso. He holds academic appointments as a clinical associate professor of plastic surgery at Texas Tech University Health Sciences Center Paul L. Foster School of Medicine and as an affiliate professor at the University of Texas at El Paso.

== Early life and education ==
Agullo earned his medical degree (MD) from Universidad Anáhuac in Mexico City, followed by a clinical internship at the American British Cowdray Medical Center. He completed a general surgery residency at Texas Tech University Health Sciences Center in El Paso and a plastic surgery fellowship at the Mayo Clinic in Rochester, Minnesota.

== Career ==
Agullo joined the faculty of the Texas Tech University Health Sciences Center Paul L. Foster School of Medicine in 2009 as a clinical assistant professor of plastic surgery and became a clinical associate professor in 2011.

Following completion of his training, Agullo began practicing in El Paso, Texas, in 2009 and founded Southwest Plastic Surgery in 2013, where he serves as medical director. His clinical practice focuses on aesthetic plastic surgery procedures.

His work has included research on gluteal fat grafting and clinical studies, with a 2024 article in Aesthetic Plastic Surgery addressing multidisciplinary approaches to the procedure. He has also served as an investigator in clinical trials involving breast implants and reconstructive techniques.

== Research and publications ==
Agullo is a member of the editorial boards of Aesthetic Plastic Surgery, the official journal of the International Society of Aesthetic Plastic Surgery, and Plastic and Reconstructive Surgery – Global Open.

== Professional organisations ==
Agullo is a Fellow of the American College of Surgeons and a member of the American Society of Plastic Surgeons, the American Society for Aesthetic Plastic Surgery, the International Society of Aesthetic Plastic Surgery, the Texas Medical Association, the American Medical Association, and the El Paso County Medical Society.

He served as vice president and later president of the World Association of Gluteal Surgeons (WAGS).

== Humanitarian work ==
Since 2011, Agullo has participated in surgical missions for cleft lip and palate correction through organisations including Smile Network and Operation Smile in Honduras, Mexico, and Peru. During his medical training, he volunteered with Caritas in rural Mexico and with Casa de la Amistad, an organisation supporting children with cancer.
