= Crime of Gádor =

1910 kidnapping and murder of a boy

Coordinates: 36°56′28″N 2°28′36″W

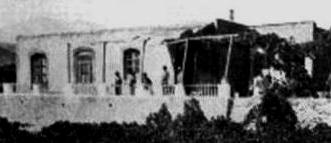
- Cortijo de San Patricio, where the murder occurred

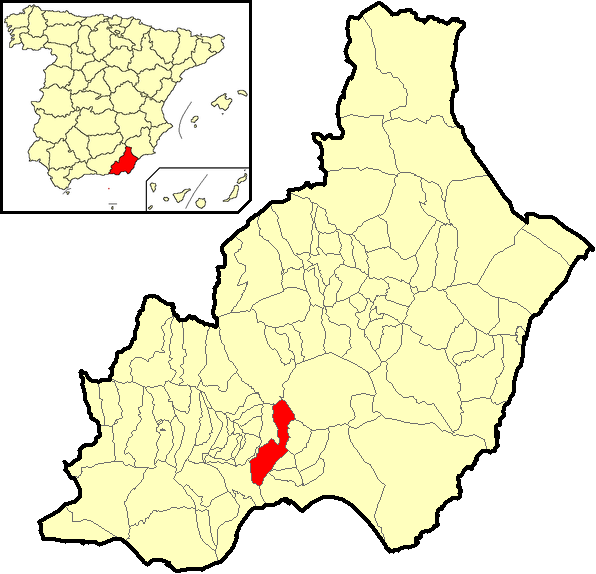
- Location of Gádor
- Native name: El crimen de Gádor
- Location: Gadór, Andalusia, Spain
- Date: 28 June 1910
- Attack type: Kidnapping
- Weapons: Knife and stone
- Victim: Bernardo González Parra (Note: El Popular erroneously reported his name as Bernardo González Cazorla.)
- Perpetrators: Agustina Rodríguez; Francisco Ortega el Moruno; José Hernández; Julio "El Tonto" Hernández; Francisco Leona
- Verdict: Guilty

The crime of Gádor is the name given to the kidnapping and subsequent murder of seven-year-old Bernardo González Parra, which took place on 28 June 1910 in Gádor, Almería, Spain. The purpose of the crime was to use the child's blood and body fat as a folk cure for a wealthy patron's tuberculosis.

== Background ==
At the time, it was believed that drinking the blood of a human child and using their body fat as cataplasm was a remedy for tuberculosis.

Francisco Ortega, known as El Moruno (The Moor), had recently been diagnosed with tuberculosis and was desperately seeking a cure. He visited the local curandera Agustina Rodríguez, who in turn sent for barber and fellow curandero Francisco Leona. Leona, who also had a criminal record, agreed to cure Ortega in exchange for 3000 reales.

Leona enlisted the help of Rodríguez's son, day laborer Julio Hernández Rodríguez, El Tonto (The Fool) (born 1884), and offered to find a child. Another son of Rodríguez, José Hernández, was to advise the client Ortega, leaving his wife Elena to make dinner.

== Murder ==
On the evening of 27 June 1910, Francisco Leona kidnapped Bernardo González Parra, a seven-year-old from Rioja, son of Francisco González Siles and María González Parra Cazorla. While El Tonto Hernández distracted Bernardo, Leona covered Bernardo's mouth with a handkerchief bathed in chloroform. After that, the two men stuffed Bernardo into a gunny sack and transported him to a cortijo. Leona lay Bernardo down on a table, and held by the others, he stabbed him in the armpit while Agustina Rodríguez picked up the blood with a cooking pot and gave to Francisco Ortega.

Ortega mixed Bernardo's blood with sugar and drank it. After that they took the boy to a place known as Las Pocicas where Leona killed him, crushing his skull with a rock. Then he extracted fat and mesentery to make a compress to apply to Ortega's chest.

To finish the ritual, Bernardo's body was concealed in a crevice, unburied but covered with herbs and stones, located in Las Pocicas.

When distributing the actual 3000 reales Ortega paid him for his services, Leona didn't share it out equally so Julio Hernández resorted to authorities and declared the crime.

Realizing Leona's intentions, Hernández told the Civil Guards who had seen the body of a child while he was chasing partridges.

== Judicial and police intervention ==
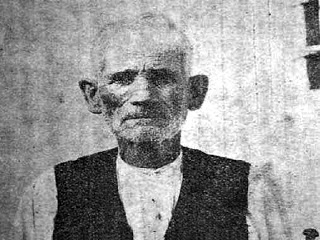
Leona in 1910

When law enforcement officers arrived, the people of Gádor turned Leona over to them, as he was known for his illegal and occult practices. During court proceedings, Leona indicted el Tonto Hernández in his testimony, who in turn did the same to Leona. Finally, after multiple excuses, both confessed to the crime.

Most of the perpetrators were executed by hanging. Leona was sentenced to death by garrote, but died in prison. The client, Ortega, and Agustina, the curandera, were both sentenced to death. José Hernández, was sentenced to 17 years in prison while his wife, Elena, was acquitted. Julio el Tonto tried to kill himself by hanging on 1 August 1910, and was sentenced to death, too, but received a pardon on grounds of insanity following a psychiatric report.

== Aftermath ==
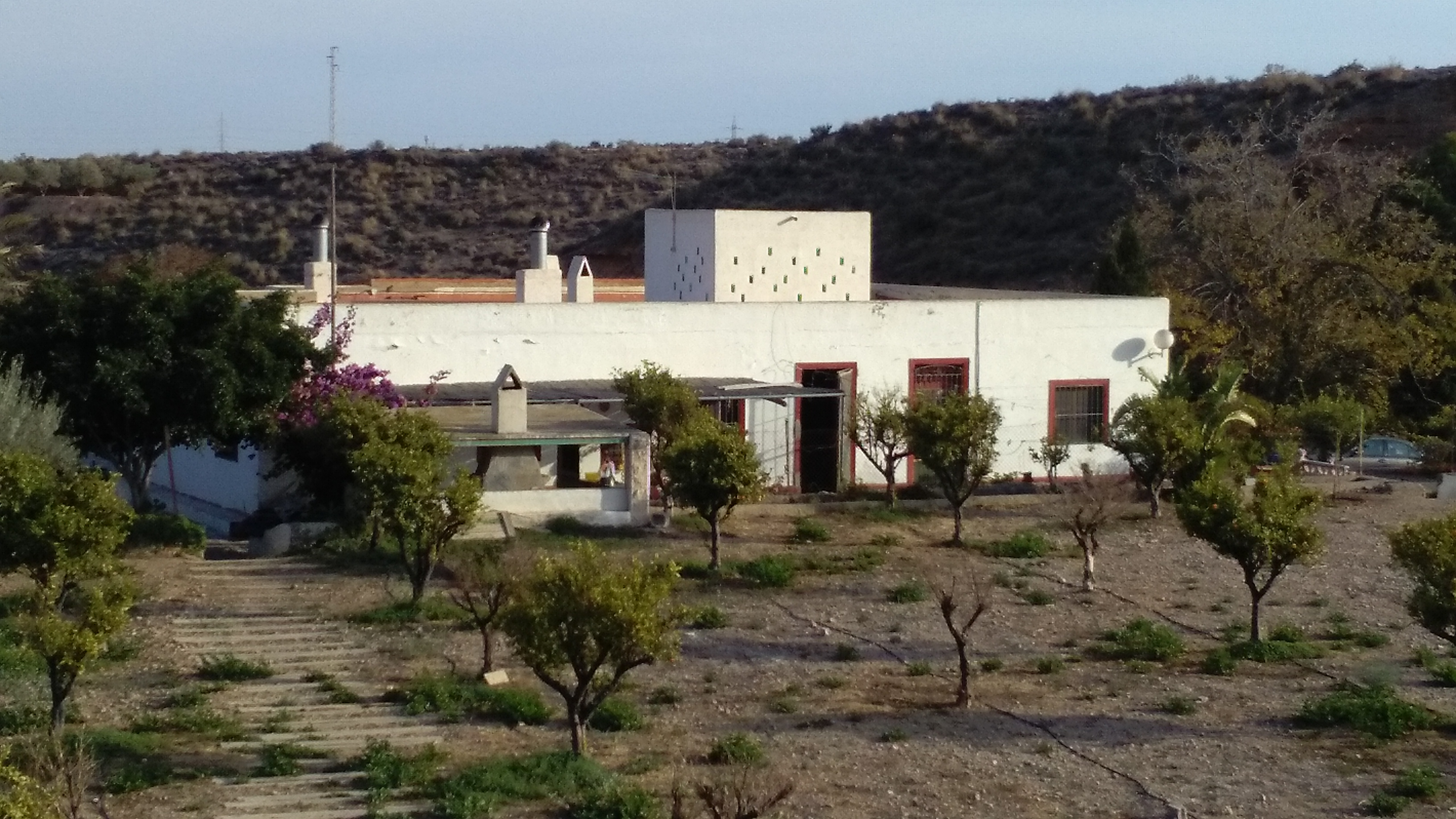
Cortijo de San Patricio at present

This crime gave rise to the terms hombre del saco and sacamantecas, because the kidnappers used a gunny sack to carry the child. It was defined as "medical crime", inspired by folk beliefs about the medicinal properties of human blood and children's manteca.

A TV episode named El sacamantecas was released in 1986. Between 1990 and 2000 Quina Jiménez bought the cortijo and she restyled it. A documentary directed by Juan Francisco Viruega and named La cicatriz was released on 21 November 2019 during the XVIII Festival Internacional de Cine de Almería. The film The Boogeyman: The Origin of the Myth (2023), directed by Ángel Gómez Hernández, was inspired by this crime.

== See also ==
- List of incidents of cannibalism
- Medical cannibalism

== Bibliography ==
- Fernández Juárez, Gerardo (2008). Kharisiris en acción: cuerpo, persona y modelos médicos en el Altiplano de Bolivia. Editorial Abya Yala. p. 283. ISBN 9789978227213.
- García Bautista, José Manuel (16 June 2015). Guía de la Andalucía mágica: Lugares legendarios y paranormales del sur de España. Grupo Planeta Spain. pp. 15–18. ISBN 9788415864714.
- Campos Herrero, Joaquín (23 February 2016). ¿Quién agota mis pilas?. Punto Rojo Libros. pp. 49–51. ISBN 9781635035414.
