= Sacamantecas =

Spanish name for a bogeyman or criminal that kills for human fat

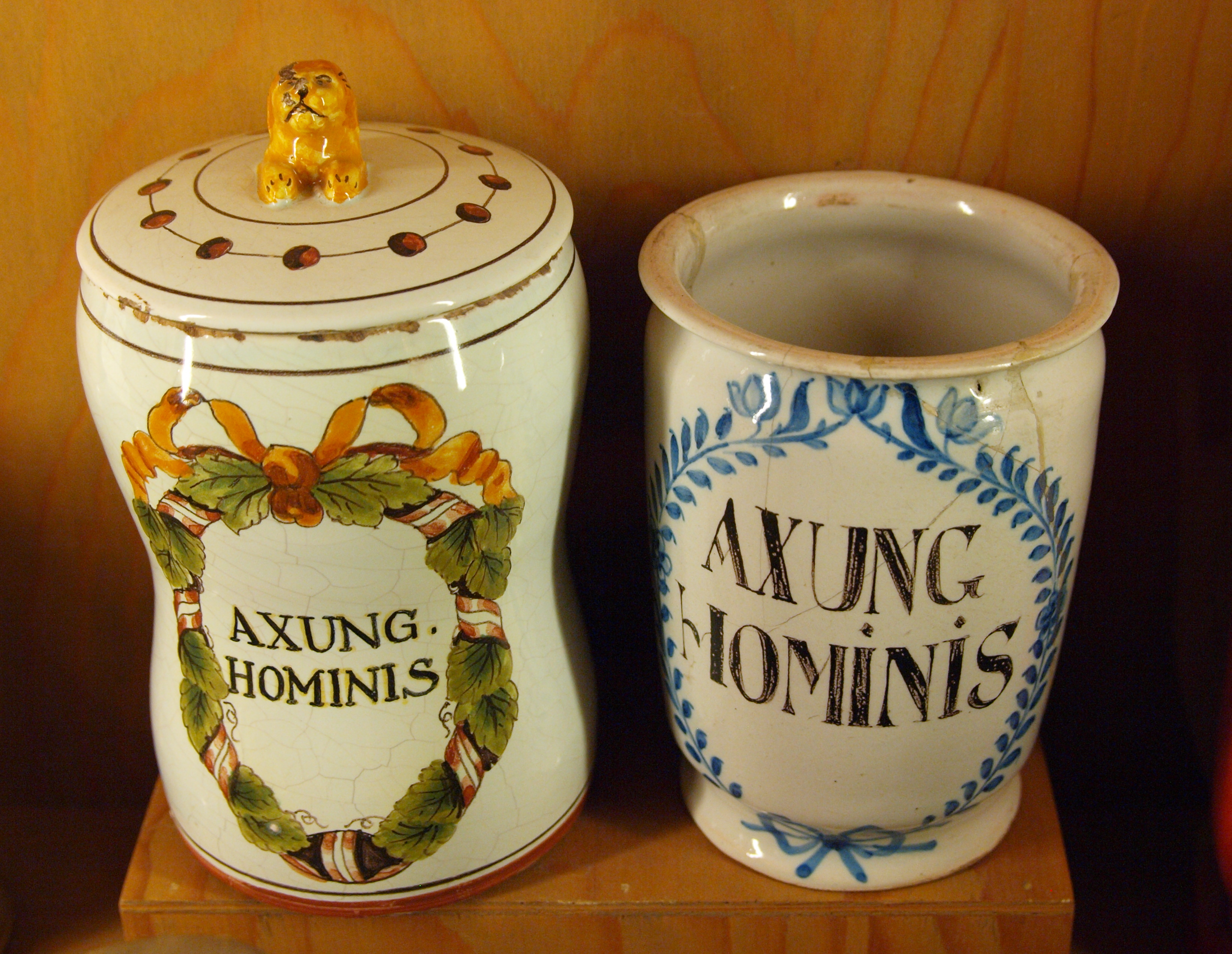
Apothecary containers for Axungia hominis (human fat), 17th-18th centuries.

Sacamantecas ("Fat extractor" in Spanish) or mantequero ("Fat seller/maker") is the Spanish name for a kind of bogeyman or criminal characterized by killing for human fat.

== Anthropology ==
Julian Pitt-Rivers reports in his study of Alcalá de la Sierra, the belief that village children can be stolen by an outsider, called el sacamantecas, disguised as a beggar or a trader, who is hired by a rich man whose ill child can only be cured with the blood of healthy babies. The practice of blood donation lent credence to the myth.

Gerald Brenan describes the mantequero as a monster in human form who lives in deserted areas and feeds on manteca ("human fat"). Upon capture, he shouts in a high-pitched voice and, unless just fed, looks thin.

Brenan found the myth alive during his stays in the Alpujarra (Andalusia). In 1927 or 1928, he had sublet his Yegen home to the British writer Dick Strachey, nephew of Lytton Strachey. One day, Strachey was walking on rough terrain where he saw three Romani men, of whom he was suspicious. Fearing that they were bandits, he ran away, but the three men chased him and drew their knives, shouting at him. They believed him to be a mantequero and wanted to kill him and to use his blood for magical remedies. However, the eldest man, a convict, judged it safer to bring Strachey to the mayor. They offered to slit his throat themselves, but Strachey claimed in rudimentary Spanish to be a relative of the British King George V and convinced the mayor that he was'not a monster.

A friend of Brenan found that in Torremolinos all the girls believed in mantequeros. In the urban version of the legend, an old evil marquis needs transfusion of babies' blood to rejuvenate.

== Real sacamantecas ==
- Manuel Blanco Romasanta (1809-1863) was the first serial killer documented in Spain. He operated in Galicia. With the fat of his victims he made soap for sale. During his trial, he alleged to be cursed with lycanthropy.
- Juan Díaz de Garayo (1821-1881) was a Spanish serial killer operating in Northern Spain. He was nicknamed el Sacamantecas, which became used to scare children into behaving.
- In 1910 Francisco Leona and Julio Tonto Hernández kidnapped and killed a boy of seven years for his blood and fat to treat the tuberculosis of Francisco Ortega, a wealthy farmer who hired the men for that purpose in what is known as the Crime of Gádor.

== Similar beliefs ==
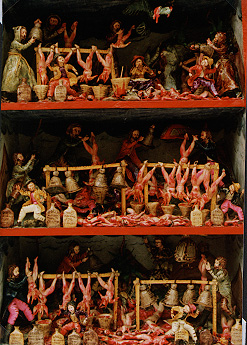
Pishtacos in the Colonial era (top), 20th century (middle) and now (bottom). Peruvian retablo from Ayacucho.

- The Peruvian tradition of the pishtaco has many similarities being understood as monsters or foreigners who collect human fat from their victims.
- Urban legends about organ trafficking show similar fears in modern contexts.
- Vampires in European folklore draw blood from humans.
- Brenan finds a similarity between the mantequero and the Persian manticore (a man-eating chimera cited by H.J. Tarry, Ctesias' Persica and Aristotle's History of Animals).
- Other bogeymen in Hispanic culture are the coco, the Sack Man and the Tío del Saín (Murcia).

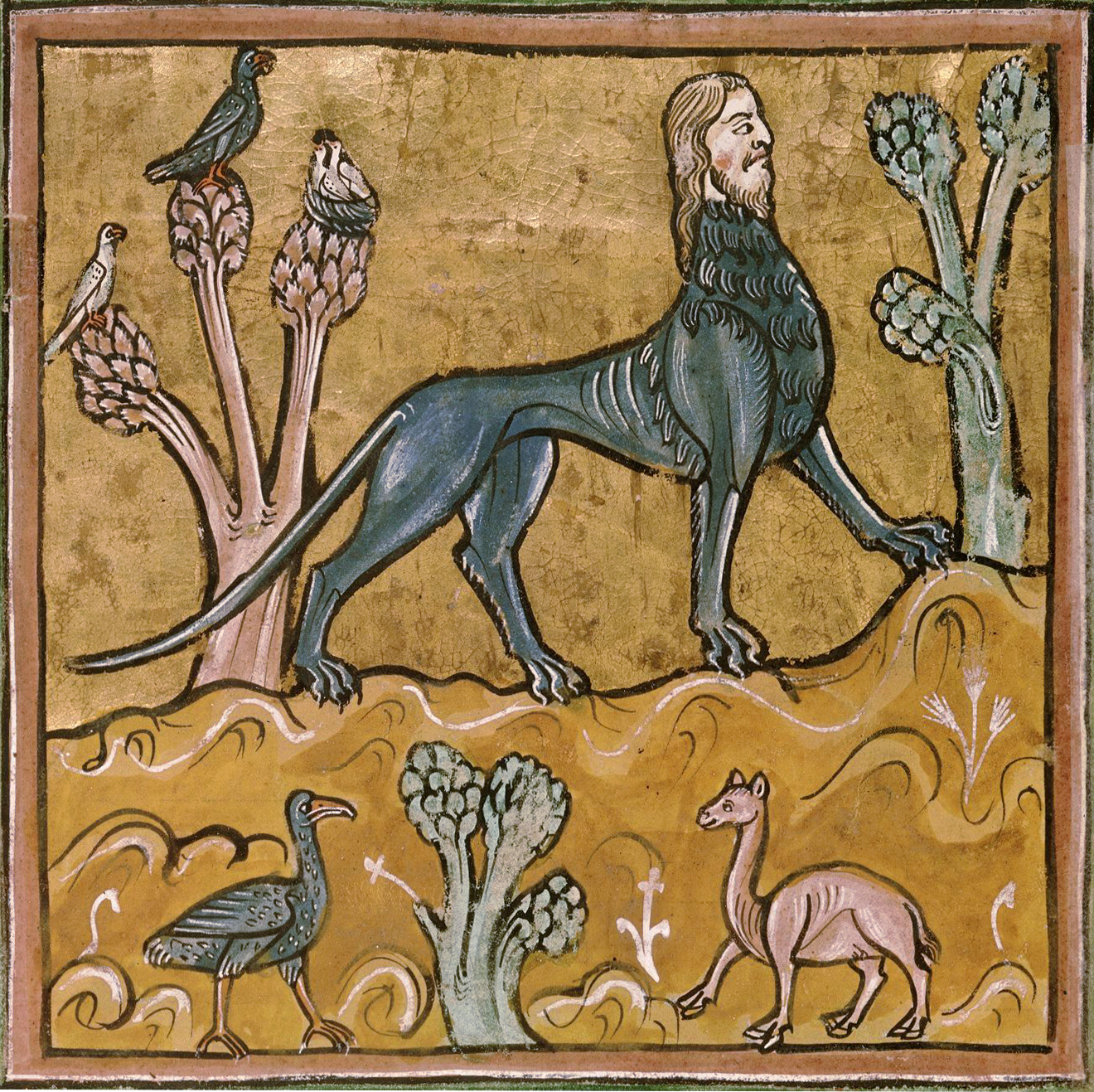
A manticore in a 13th-century manuscript.

== In popular culture ==
- Bernardo Atxaga's Obabakoak includes a chapter on the Sacamantecas, stating that it was believed that baby fat was what made railways so fast.
- The 2009 Spanish short film Sacamantecas was directed by Alejandro Ballesteros and Antonio Curado.
