= The Man with the Bag =

"The Man with the Bag" may refer to:

- The Sack Man, a mythical figure
- Santa Claus, in reference to the bag full of gifts he is said to carry
  - "(Everybody's Waitin' for) The Man with the Bag", a Christmas song
  - "The Man with the Bag", an episode of Ally McBeal
  - The Man with the Bag (film), an upcoming Christmas film
