= Quina Jiménez =

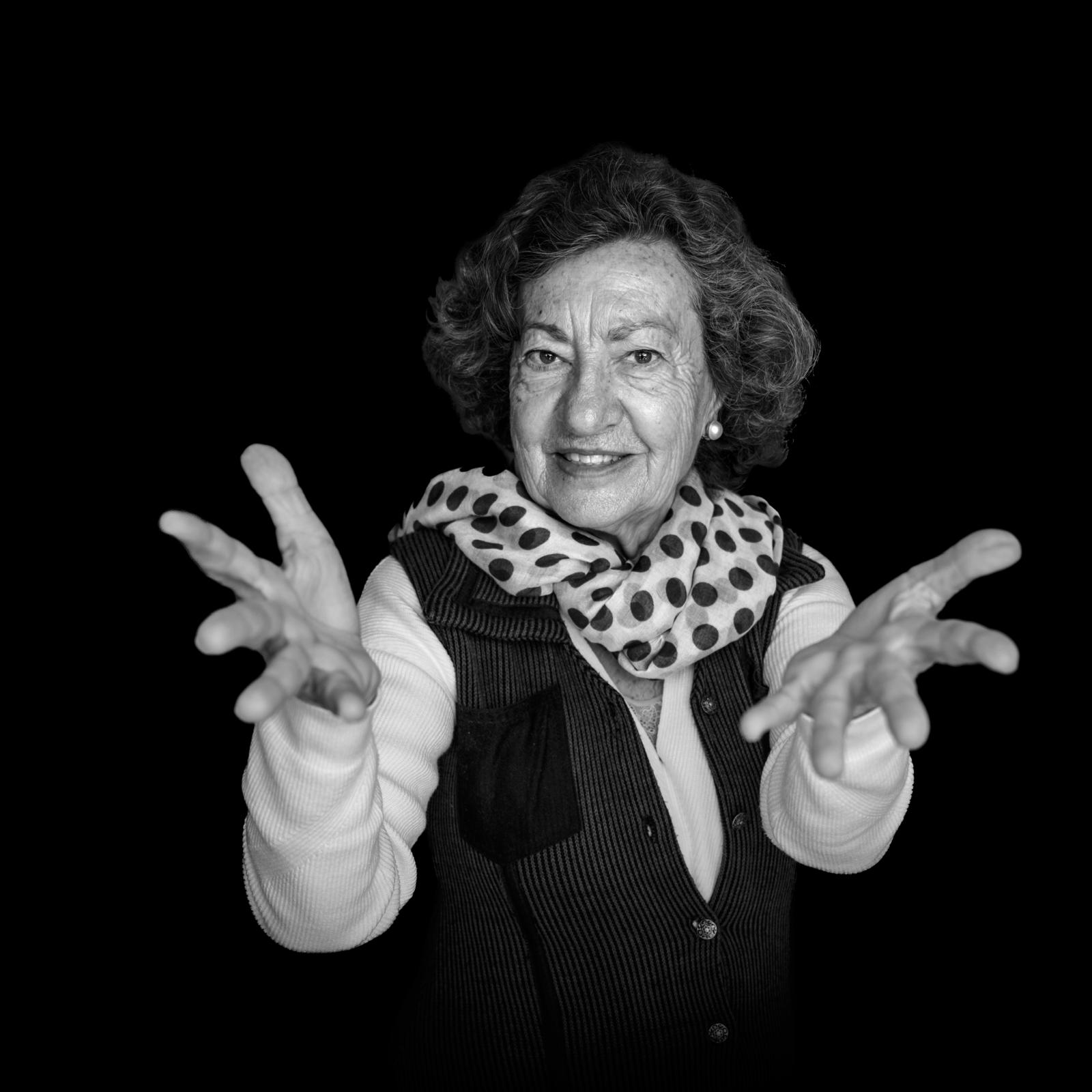
- Quina portrait in 2024 by Rodrigo Valero
- Born: Joaquina Jiménez Sánchez; October 28, 1941 (age 83); Almería
- Occupation(s): Flamenco dancer and dance teacher

Joaquina Jiménez Sánchez, known as Quina Jiménez or Quinita (born 28 October 1941), is a former Spanish flamenco dancer, dance teacher, and artist. She was one of the greatest dance teacher in Almería and foremother of Conservatorio de Danza de Almería.

== Biography ==
Quina Jiménez was born in Almería on 28 October 1941 and studied at Colegio Ave María and then she studied at las Jesuitinas. In 1951 she started to dance at the same time she was studying bachillerato at Celia Viñas and working. In 1953 she worked in a library, bookshop and odontologist. She also directed Asociación Alondra de Dupont alongside Mari Carmen Sánchez Paniagua, Lola Sánchez Herrera and Juan Pedro de Cóndor, an animal shelter. And she made volunteer works collaborating as dining room assistant.

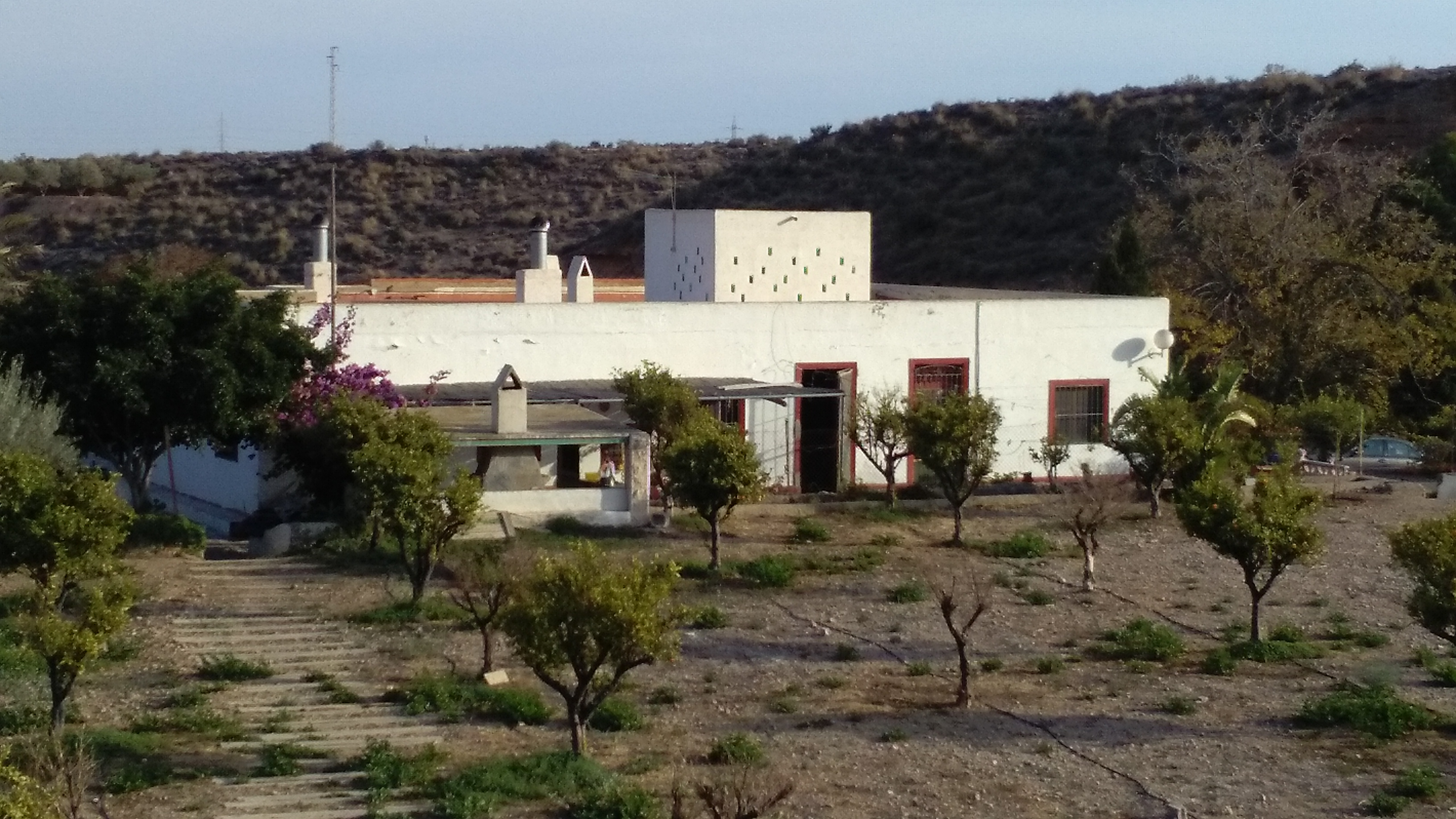
Cortijo owned by Quina

Between 1990 and 2000 she bought a cortijo in Gádor where the crime of Gádor was carried out in the beginning of the 20th century. There she harvests olives from the trees and takes care of chickens and dogs.

== Career ==
She belonged to Coros y Danzas of Educación y Descanso, she formed the group and practiced on Teatro Apolo. In 1950 she became the directress of that group and they won a national competition in Spain which took place on Santiago Bernabeu Stadium, alongside Marisol and it was presented by Francisco Franco. The group attended the television programm hosted by Antoñita Moreno, where they danced the choreography Si vas pa la mar, which depicted fisherpeople from Almería seweing nets and sailing. In the 1960s she danced alongside Maribel with Manolo Escobar at Teatro Apolo, and his brother Baldomero played the guitar.

In the 1970s she moved to conservatorio de Málaga and Murcia to study the bachelor's degree of classical dance and Spanish dance respectively, and finally she decided to move to Sevilla and Córdoba. She was discovered by the teachers Angelita and Pepe Payes, so she travelled to Europe (England, France and Germany) and around the world (Al Hoceima and Colombia), and she collaborated with José Richoly and Pepe González.

In the 1980s she opened a dance school on Padre Santaella street, and she also taught in a building on Rambla Obispo Orberá and other homes. Then she requested to Almería City Hall and Provincial Deputation of Almería to build a conservatorium, which was opened in 1990, and he was the directress of it, where she trained leading figures during more than 20 years. In 1989 she received the Bayyana Award for her dedication to dance.

On 7 June 2017 Estudio de Danza Quina Jiménez attended a fashion show at Teatro Cervantes named "Mucho por vivir" about lingerie and bath clothing to draw attention to women who suffered from breast cancer. After her retirement, she studied at University for Seniors.

On 10 November 2022 she was awarded with the Premio a la Cultura for her role to magnify the dance in Spain.

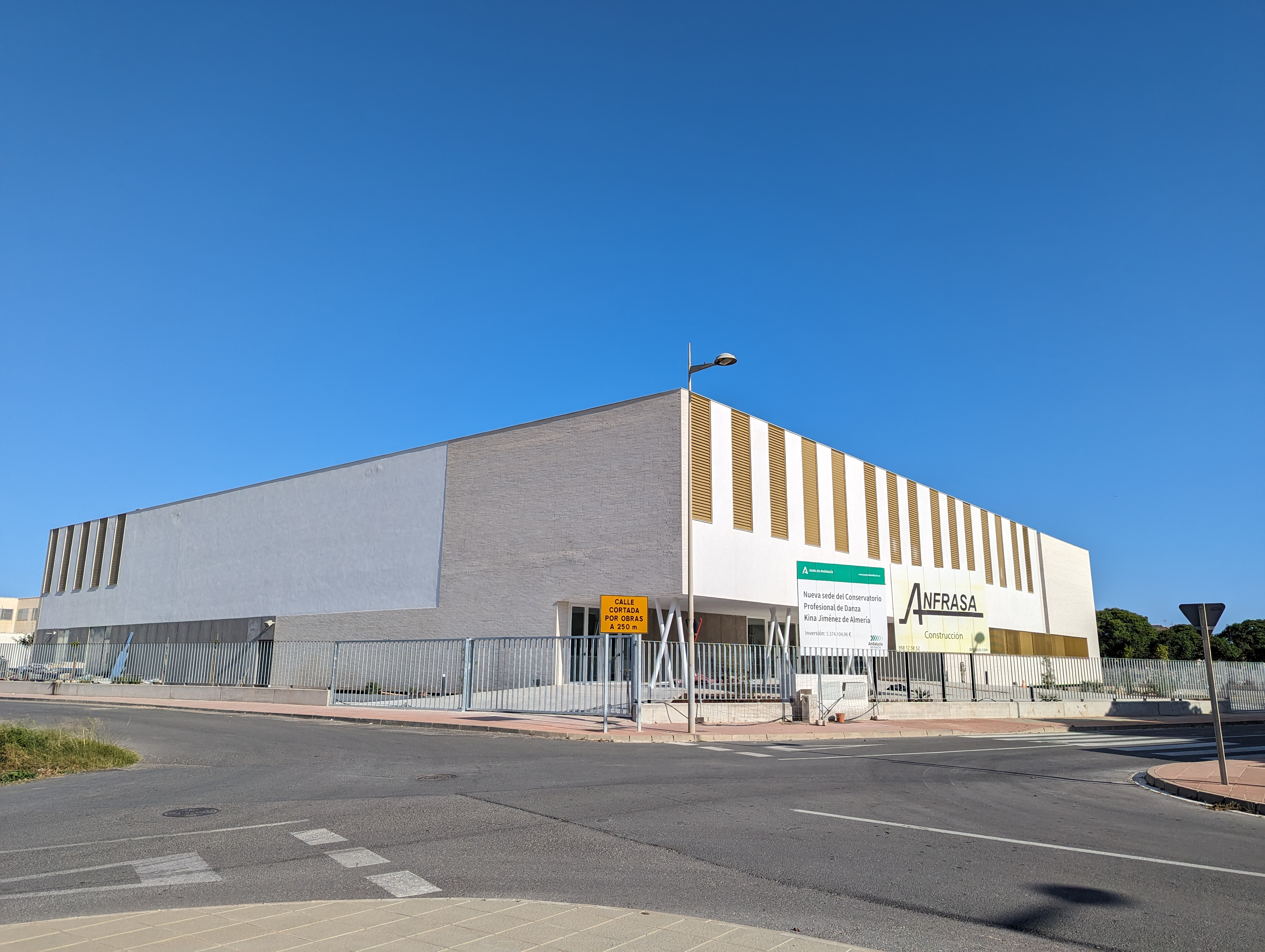
Conservatorio Profesional de Danza Kina Jiménez

Conservatorio Profesional de Danza in Almería was named Kina Jiménez due to her work to get the job of the dance recognized in Spain. Located in Nueva Almería, it was inaugurated on 15 March 2024 after 20 years of fighting for recognition, with 4,952 m^{2} which have an auditorium, 20 dance classrooms, 2 music classrooms and a make-up room, with a capacity of 420 students.
