= Human fat =

Historic pharmaceutical substance of human origin

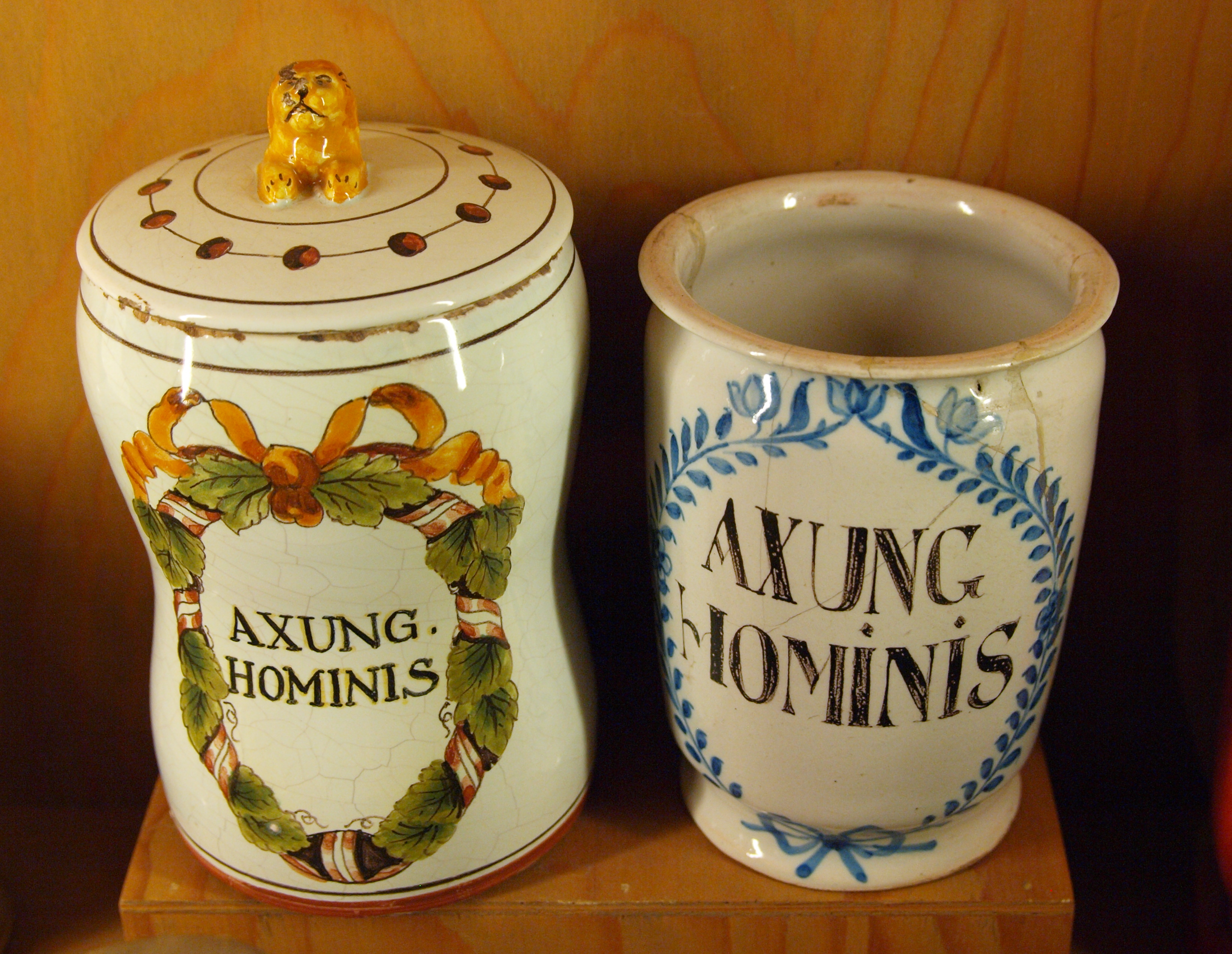
Apothecary jars for storing human fat, c. 17th or 18th century.

Human fat was mentioned in European pharmacopoeias since the 16th century as an important fatty component of quality deemed ointments and other pharmaceuticals in Europe. In old recipes human adipose tissue was mentioned as Pinguedo hominis, or Axungia hominis. The German physician Johann Agricola (1496–1570) described the recovery of human fat and its applications.

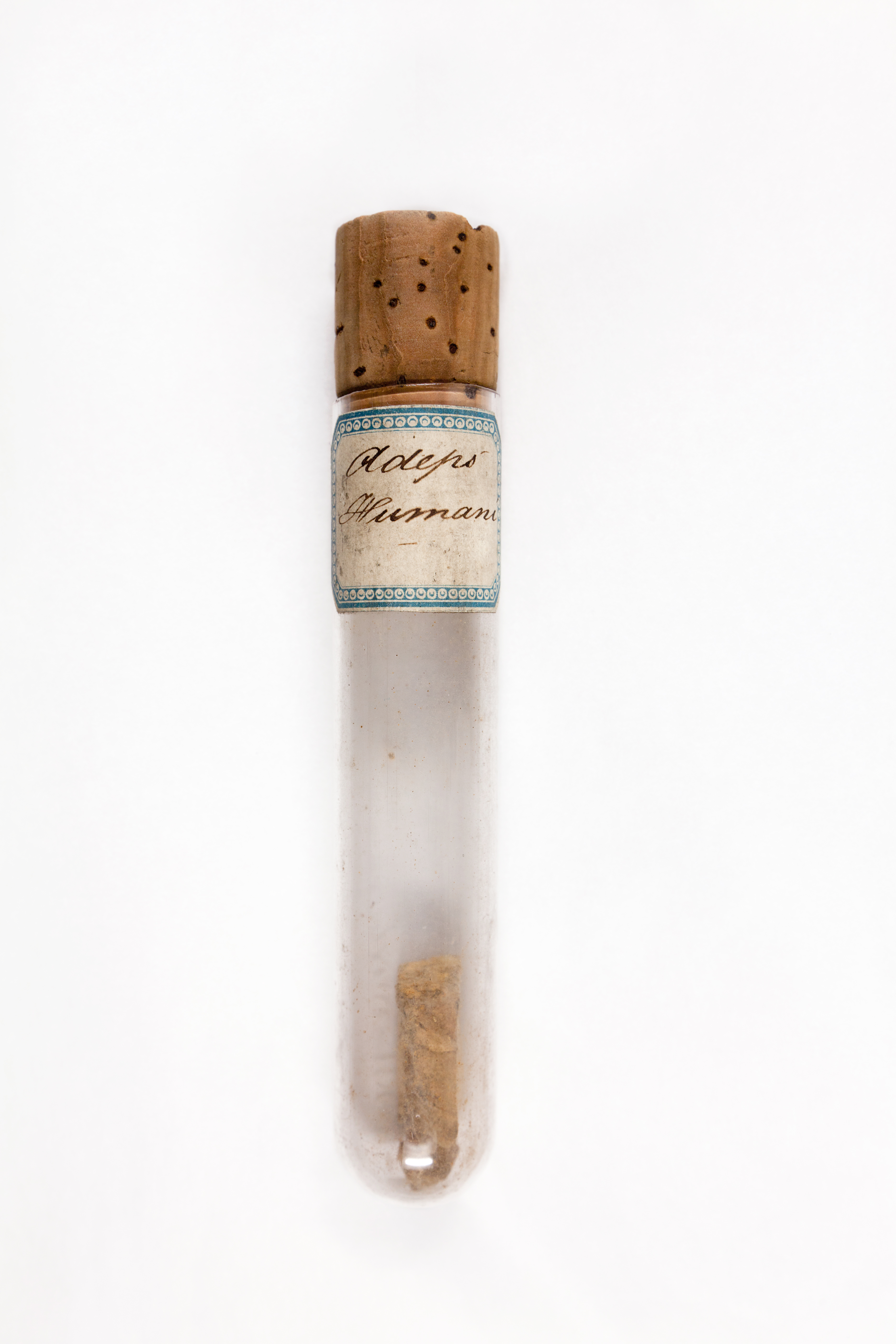
Vial labelled Adeps Humani, from the pharmacy collection of the Museum for Hamburg History.

In traditional medicine in Europe, human fat was believed to have a healing magic significance until the 19th century. Many executioners recovered the fat from the bodies of their executants, called "Armsünderfett" or "Armsünderschmalz" (German: fat or grease from poor sinners put to death), and sold it. For some executioners the marketing of human fat was a major source of revenue. The human fat was used to make ointments for treatment of various diseases such as bone pain, toothache and gout. It was also regarded as a panacea for particular diseases associated with cachexia (e.g. tuberculosis). Also an analgesic effect in rheumatoid arthritis was attributed to human fat.

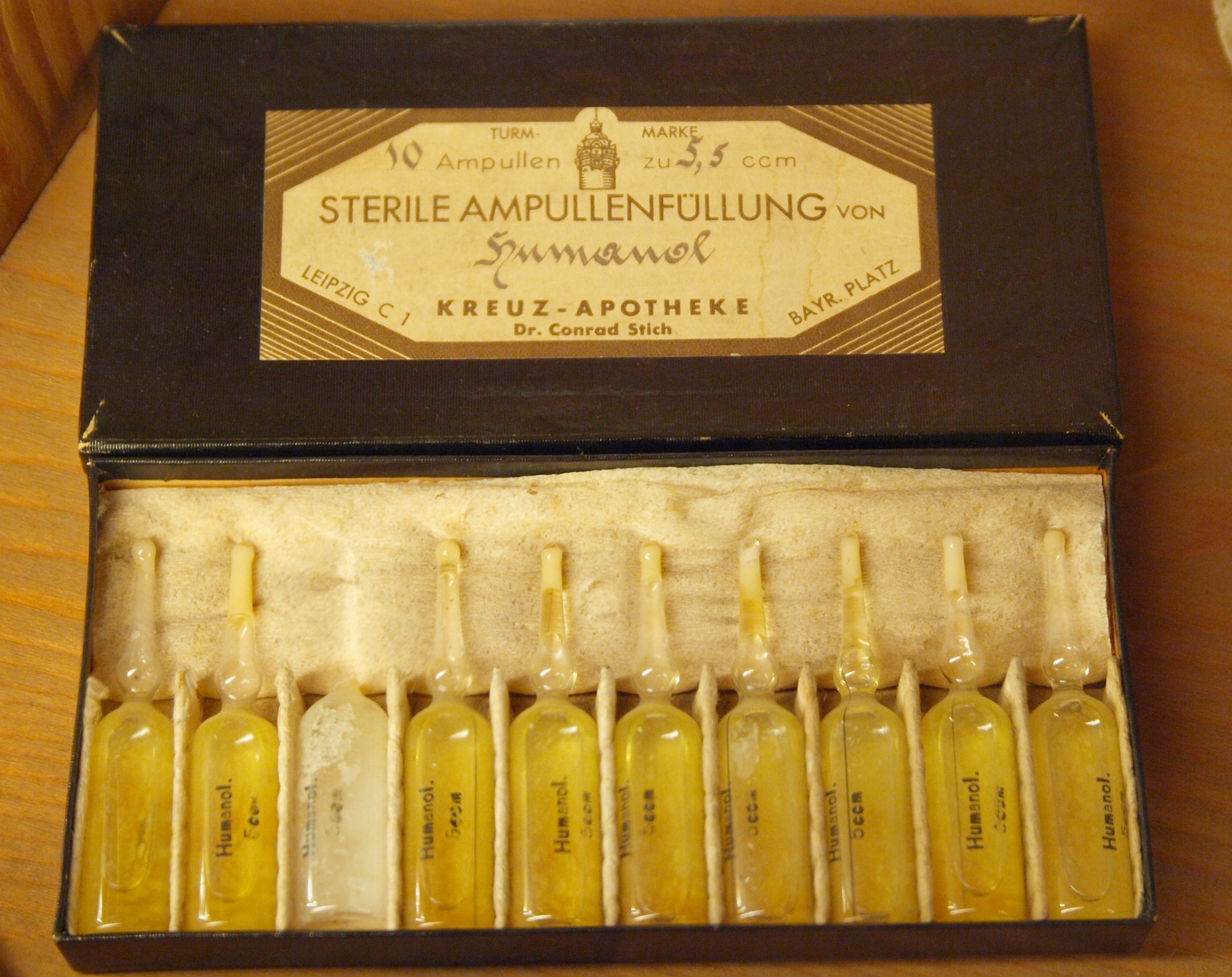
Ampoules of Humanol, c. early 20th century. The label on the box (translated from German) says: "10 ampoules of 5.5 ccm. Sterile ampoules prepared by Cross Pharmacy. Leipzig C 1, Bayrischer Platz."

From the late 19th century, human fat was produced and offered under the trade name Humanol as a sterile, liquified preparation for injections in Germany. In 1909 it was introduced for surgical treatment of scars, wound disinfection, and wound revisions. In the 1920s it went out of fashion after low cure rates and the incidence of fat embolisms caused by its application.

Until the 1960s various manufacturers offered alleged wrinkle creams for external use (Hormocenta of Hormocenta Cosmetic Böttger GmbH, or Placentubex C of Merz Pharmaceuticals) containing human fat from placentas collected from midwives and obstetric departments for industrial purposes. The use of human placentas was terminated in favour of animal products.

In 2009, a group of Peruvian gangsters, nicknamed "pishtacos" by the police, was accused of having manufactured and marketed human fat. However, the Peruvian Ministry of the Interior later described these allegations as a hoax.

In the 2010s, MTF Biologics started providing Renuva (human cadaver fat) in syringes of up to 3 cubic centimetres (0.18 cu in). In 2024, Tiger Aesthetics marketed alloClae in syringes of up to 22 cubic centimetres (1.3 cu in). These preparations are being used as injectable cosmetic fillers. The demand has risen since the popularization of GLP-1 drugs has left thinner patients that feel that they lost fat in places that do not look good. Doctors say that customers are not concerned by the origin of the fat. Donors may have not been clear about the commercial use of their remains. In 2024, the New York State Health Department denied a license to alloClae over doubts about the compliance with tissue donation laws. There can be complications with cadaver fat injections. If the fat does not vascularize, it may necrose, as in fat grafting from the patient's own body, but there are no studies comparing both methods. Cultural critic Arabelle Sicardi has compared alloClae to the 2024 film The Substance.

== Myths ==
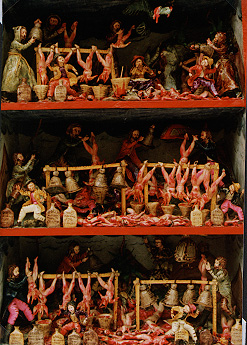
Pishtacos in the Colonial era (top), 20th century (middle) and now (bottom). Peruvian retablo from Ayacucho.

Both Spanish (sacamantecas) and Peruvian (pishtaco) folklore contain examples of monsters or criminals who murder human victims for their fat. Manuel Blanco Romasanta (1809–1863), the first serial killer documented in Spain, was accused of extracting fat from his victims to sell in Portugal, exchanging an ounce of fat for an ounce of gold.

This folk belief survives to the modern day. In Latin American urban legends, it is claimed that human fat is used to grease bells for better sound, or applied to modern machinery such as railways or airplanes.

== See also ==
- Adipocere – Waxy substance formed by anaerobic hydrolysis of fat
- Soap made from human corpses – Alleged Nazi atrocity
