= Fat transfer =

Plastic surgery

Fat transfer, also known as fat graft, lipograft, lipomodelling, or fat injections, is a surgical process in which a person's own fat is transferred from one area of the body to another area. The major aim of this procedure is to improve or augment the area that has irregularities and grooves. Carried out under either general anesthesia or local anesthesia, the technique involves three main stages: fat harvesting (extracting adipose fat), fat processing (processing the extracted fat) and fat injection (reinjecting the purified fat into the area needing improvement).

== Applications ==
Autologous fat transplantation is a widely used treatment modality because of its biocompatible properties and availability of fat for transplantation. The technique has become increasingly popular in recent years for soft tissue augmentation and volume replacement in both reconstructive and aesthetic plastic surgery.

Stem cell fat grafting is a new technique. The stem cells from fat tissue can differentiate into a number of structures, which is useful for cosmetic rejuvenation. Very small grafts (nanografts) contain no adipose cells, but their stem cell content remains useful.

=== Breast reconstruction ===
Breast reconstruction is the surgical process of rebuilding the natural shape and look of a breast, using autologous tissue, prosthetic implants, or a combination of both. The procedure is most commonly performed in women - as part of their treatment - who have had mastectomy or surgery to treat breast cancer. A doctor harvests fat from one or more areas of the patient's body where excess fat is available and grafts it to the breast for breast reconstruction surgery after a mastectomy or lumpectomy. As the procedure uses the patient's own fat, the structural fat grafting for breast reconstruction surgery is a more natural process than implants and creates a smooth, more symmetrical, look.

=== Breast augmentation and correcting asymmetry ===
Fat transfer breast augmentation is a natural solution to restore shape and volume to the breasts, which may have been lost due to factors such as aging, pregnancy/breast feeding, or weight loss. Breast asymmetry can be corrected using the fat transfer procedure, and to give the breasts the same shape and size. Breast augmentation and correction of asymmetry using fat transfer is considered to be an overall safe procedure. Any major weight gain or loss could have an impact of the procedure results because the fat transferred will behave like the fat in any other body part. The procedure is associated with certain risks such as fat necrosis or death of fat cells, a risk related to any type of fat grafting surgeries. Another risk is fat reabsorption, wherein the body may reabsorb the fat used (up to 50%) in the fat transfer augmentation procedure.

=== Gluteal augmentation ===
Fat transfer in gluteal augmentation, also known as buttock augmentation with autologous fat grafting or gluteal lift (currently marketed as the "Brazilian butt lift"), represents one of the most rapidly evolving and increasingly popular operations in aesthetic surgery. This is a "dual-benefit" body contouring procedure, because fat is harvested from areas with surplus body fat to enhance contouring using liposuction. This fat is purified and prepared for transplantation into the gluteal region to increase buttock volume. The technique that can be performed under general and local anesthesia can also create an improvement in buttock shape, along with enhancing.

=== Facial rejuvenation ===
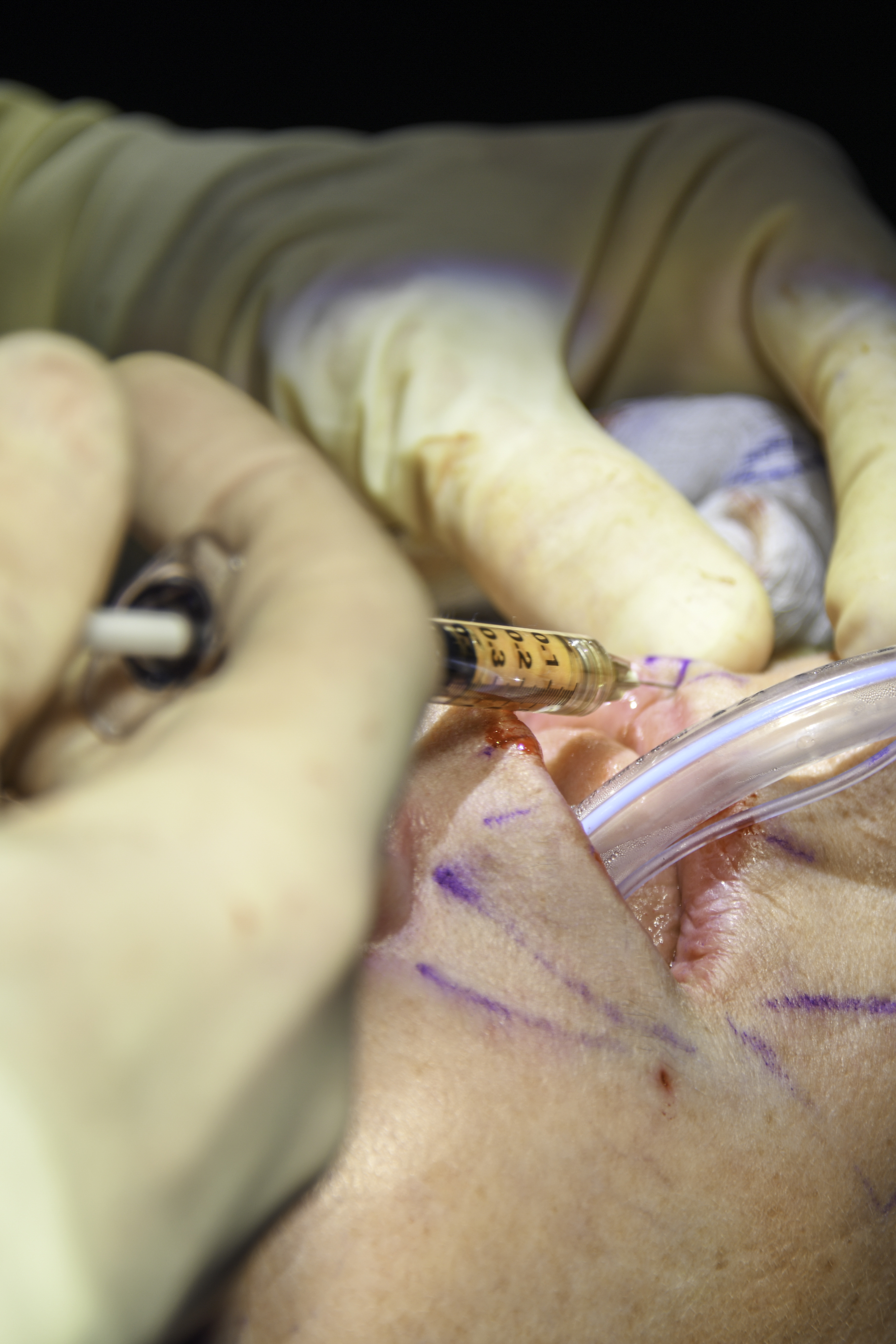
Autologous fat grafting to the perioral region demonstrating microinjection to restore volume around the mouth.

The regenerative potential of lipofilling has been attributed in part to the presence of adipose-derived stem cells (ASCs), which may contribute to improvements in tissue quality following fat grafting procedures.

Traditional approaches to facial rejuvenation primarily focused on excision of skin, muscle, and subcutaneous fat to address visible signs of aging. More recent techniques emphasize restoration of facial volume using fat grafting to replenish deflated facial compartments.

Current understanding of facial aging recognizes that changes occur at multiple structural levels, including fat atrophy, ligamentous laxity, and descent of facial compartments. As a result, contemporary rejuvenation strategies often combine structural repositioning with volume restoration rather than relying on skin excision alone. Fat grafting has been applied in multiple regions of the face, including the periorbital area, where it may improve contour irregularities and volume loss of the lower eyelid.

=== Hand rejuvenation ===
Structural fat grafting can be an ideal option to treat the signs of aging or other appearance-related issues – such as prominent-looking veins and tendons, loss of fullness, thinning skin, arthritis and wasting of the hand. The procedure involves manually harvesting fat from one or more locations on the body via liposuction and placing it around the back of the patient's hand, and sculpting it into a smooth, uniform layer for an ideal appearance. To "fine tune" the results, additional fat transfer or injection of dermal filler products can be performed. Autologous fat transfer serves as a filler in the hand rejuvenation procedure. Besides, it also rejuvenates the soft tissue and skin on the posterior side of the hands.

=== Rhinoplasty ===
Autologous micro fat transplantation is often used to correct a low dorsum and a short nose.

=== Scars and burns ===
Scars and burns caused due to various reasons such as injuries, chicken pox, acne, sun or radiation exposure, and more can be repaired with structural fat grafting. The procedure harvests fat from one or more areas of the body and places it anywhere on the body where tissue has been damaged. Structural fat grafting can improve the quality of aged and scarred skin, reduce pain and itchiness, heal radiation damage, treat chronic ulcers and reduce the appearance of scars on the face and body - including dimpling and deep depressions, resulting in thicker, softer, healthier skin.

== Complications ==
To ensure survivability, the fat graft should not be manipulated too much and it must be quickly reinjected. Possible complications are swelling, bruising, hematoma formation, paresthesia or donor-site pain, hypertrophic scarring, infection, contour irregularities, and injury caused by the cannula to the underlying structures.

== See also ==
- Human fat – Historic pharmaceutical substance of human origin
