= Nombela =

- municipality
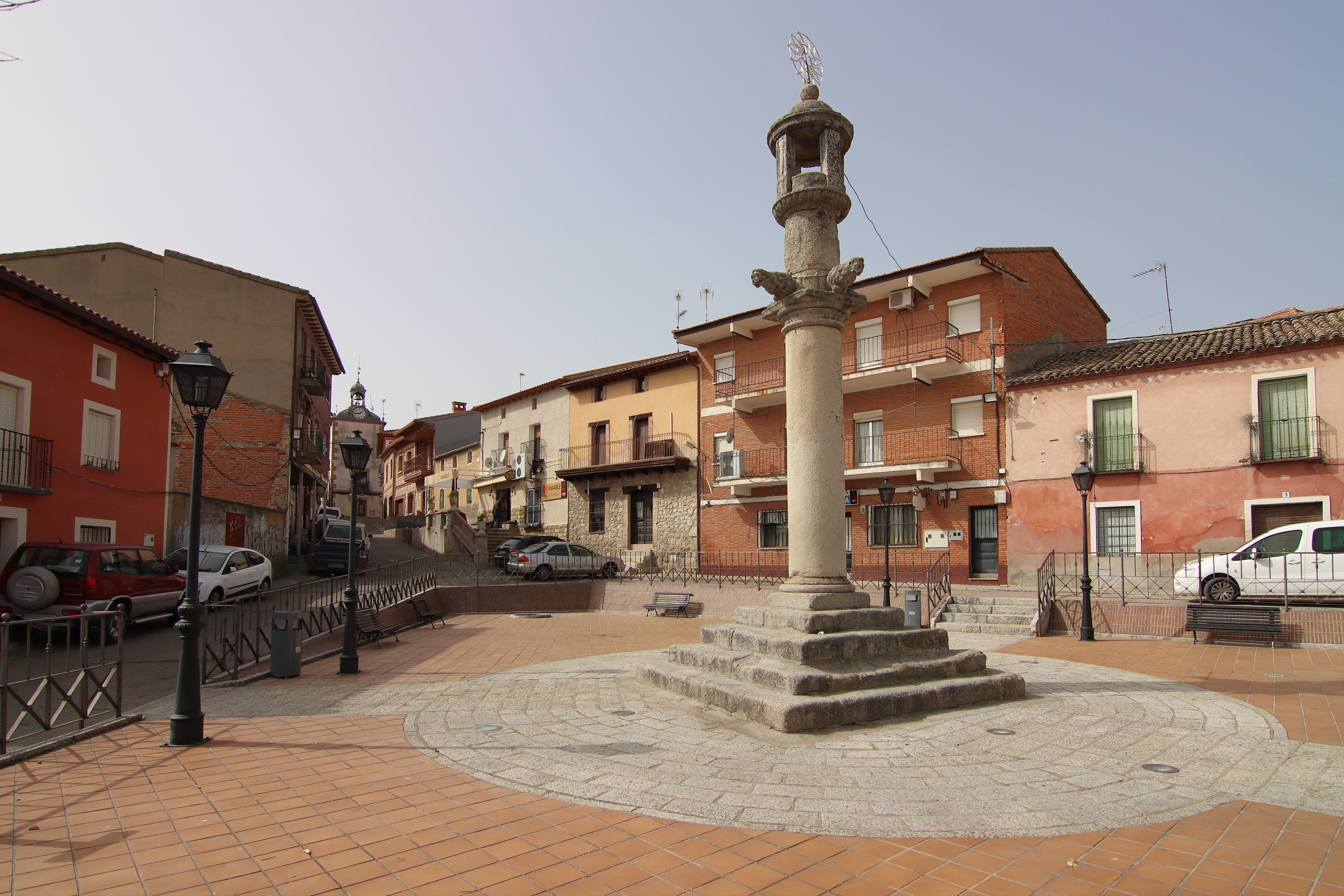
- Constitution square, Nombela

- Flag Coat of arms

- Location in Spain Nombela (Spain)
- Coordinates: 40°09′22″N 4°30′11″W
- Country: Spain
- Autonomous community: Castilla–La Mancha
- Province: Toledo

Area
  - Total: 122 km^{2} (47 sq mi)
- Elevation: 498 m (1,634 ft)

Population (2025-01-01)
  - Total: 904
  - Density: 7.41/km^{2} (19.2/sq mi)
- Time zone: UTC+1 (CET)
  - Summer (DST): UTC+2 (CEST)

Nombela is a municipality of Spain belonging to the province of Toledo, Castilla–La Mancha. According to the 2006 census (INE), the municipality has a population of 981 inhabitants.

== Geography ==
Located in the central part of the Iberian Peninsula at about 490 metres above mean sea level, the town is the Spanish settlement furthest removed from the sea.

== History ==
Nombela earned the status of 'town' (villa) in 1579.
