= Axungia =

Medical uses of soft animal fat

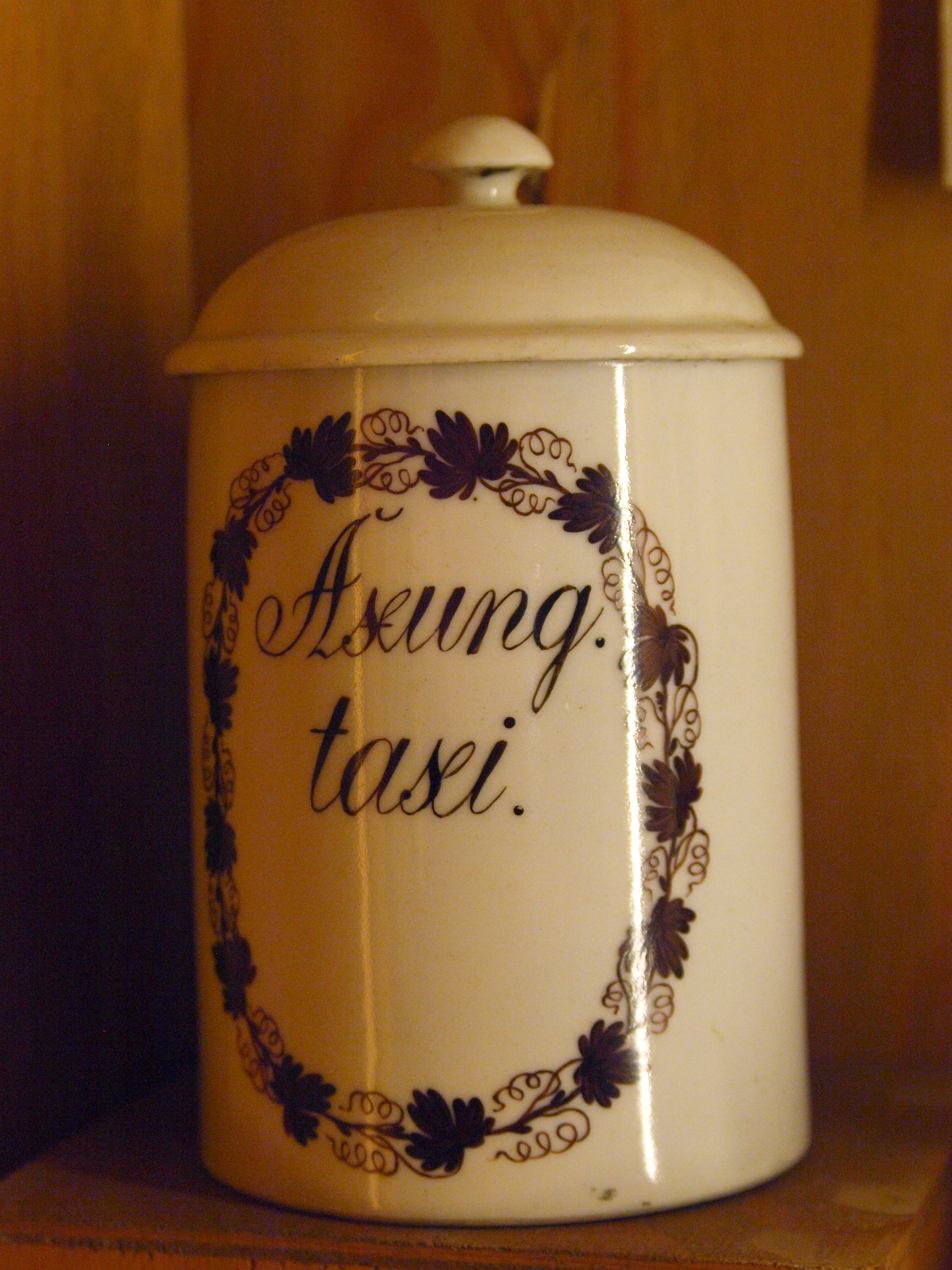
Apothecary vessel with inscription Axung. taxi., 'badger fat' dating from the 19th century

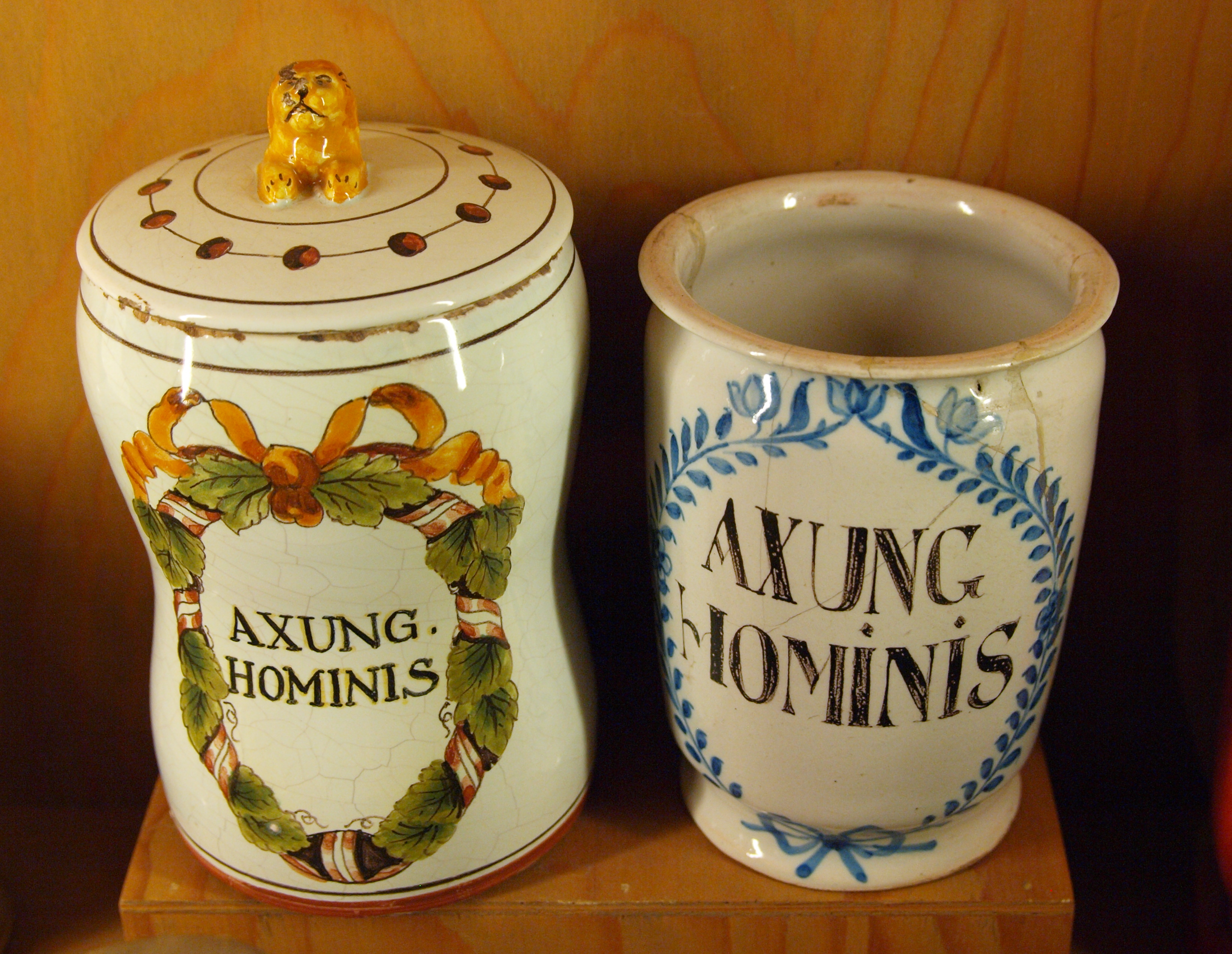
Two apothecary vessels with inscription AXUNG. HOMINIS, 'human fat' dating approximately from 17th or 18th century.

Axungia is a kind of soft animal fat, usually from around the kidneys of geese or pigs, used in pre-modern western medicine. It differs from lard, which is firm, and suet or adeps, which is dry.

The ancient Romans distinguished fat into pinguedo or axungia, and adeps or sebum; but writers often interchange the terms.

In pre-modern medicine, physicians made use of the axungia of the goose, the dog, the viper, and some others, especially that of humans, considered of "extraordinary service in the drawing and ripening of tumors, etc." (see attrahent)

== Etymology ==
From French axunge, adapted from Latin axungia 'axle grease' = axis 'axle' + ungere 'to grease'.
