= Romasanta =

2004 Spanish-Italian-British horror film

- Theatrical release poster
- Directed by: Paco Plaza
- Written by: Elena Serra; Alberto Marini
- Story by: Alfredo Conde
- Produced by: Julio Fernández; Brian Yuzna
- Starring: Julian Sands; Elsa Pataky; John Sharian
- Cinematography: Javiar Salmones
- Edited by: David Gallart
- Music by: Mikel Salas
- Production companies: Fantastic Factory; Filmax; Future Films; Castelao Producciones; Instituto de la Cinematografía y de las Artes Audiovisuales (ICAA); Canal+ Spain; Xunta de Galicia; Televisió de Catalunya; Televisión de Galicia (TVG) S.A.
- Distributed by: Filmax
- Release date: 14 May 2004 (Spain)
- Running time: 89 minutes
- Countries: Spain; United Kingdom; Italy
- Language: English
- Budget: $5 million

Romasanta, also known as Romasanta, la caza de la bestia in Spanish, and Romasanta: The Werewolf Hunt in English, is a 2004 Spanish-Italian-British horror film directed by Paco Plaza and starring Julian Sands, Elsa Pataky and John Sharian. It is available on DVD from Lion's Gate Entertainment under the title Werewolf Hunt.

Based on a script by Alfredo Conde, according to the end credits the film is based on a true story, that of Manuel Blanco Romasanta, Spain’s first documented serial killer. Conde is a descendant of one of the doctors involved the original Werewolf of Allariz court case that took place in 1853/54 in Galicia, Spain. He went on to write a fictional novel, The Uncertain Memoirs of a Galician Wolfman: Romasanta. The same case previously provided the basis for the 1968 Spanish film El bosque del lobo ("The Wolf's Forest").

== Plot ==
The story takes place in 1851 in a small Spanish village apparently plagued by what we would now call a serial killer, as corpses are discovered bearing both savage mutilation and precise surgical incisions. Clues point toward Manuel Romasanta, who confesses to the crimes, but claims that he is a victim of lycanthropy. A scientist, Professor Philips, argues that Romasanta suffers not from a supernatural curse but from a mental disorder.

== Cast ==
- Julian Sands as Manuel Romasanta
- Elsa Pataky as Barbara
- John Sharian as Antonio
- David Gant as Professor Philips
- Gary Piquer as District Attorney Luciano de la Bastida
- Maru Valdivielso as Maria
- Luna McGill as Teresa
- Carlos Reig-Plaza as Gomez
- Ivana Baquero as Ana

== Production ==
Romasanta was filmed on location in Galicia, Spain.

== Release ==
Filmax released theatrically the film in Spain on 14 May 2004. Lions Gate acquired North American rights to the film. The film was given a straight-to-video release in the United States on 22 November 2005 under the alternate title of Werewolf Hunter.

== Reception ==
=== Critical response ===
Jonathan Holland of Variety commended the film for its cinematography, visual and audio effects, as well as Sands' and Pataky's performances; but felt that the romance was underdeveloped, stating that the script covered too much ground and lacked "dramatic focus". Jon Condit of Dread Central rated the film a score of four out of five, offering similar praise, also commending its gothic atmosphere and historical and scientific context, while criticizing the film's slow pacing. Cinema Crazed's Felix Vasquez gave the film a mostly positive review, calling it "a grim, bleak, and original peak into the rare disease of lycanthropy, and posits a new take on the werewolf genre; while noting the film's plot holes, and 'confusing' characterizations. AllMovie's Jeremy Wheeler praised the film's cinematography, production values, special effects, and performances.

=== Awards ===
Romasanta was nominated for a number of Spanish awards, including two Goya Awards (Best Cinematography and Best Special Effects) and two Barcelona Film Awards (Best Film Editing and Best New Director).
