= Aesthetic Plastic Surgery =

- Discipline: Plastic surgery
- Language: English
- Edited by: Bahman Guyuron

Publication details
- History: 1976–present
- Publisher: Springer Science+Business Media
- Frequency: Bimonthly
- Impact factor: 2.326 (2020)

Standard abbreviations
- ISO 4: Aesthet. Plast. Surg.
- NLM: Aesthetic Plast Surg

Indexing
- ISSN: 0364-216X (print); 1432-5241 (web)
- OCLC no.: 475053803

Links
- Journal homepage; Online access

Aesthetic Plastic Surgery is a bimonthly peer-reviewed medical journal covering all aspects of aesthetic plastic surgery. It was established in 1976 and is published by Springer Science+Business Media on behalf of the International Society of Aesthetic Plastic Surgery. It is the official journal of the European Association of Societies of Aesthetic Plastic Surgery and the Sociedade Brasileira de Cirurgia Plastica. The editor-in-chief is Bahman Guyuron

== Abstracting and indexing ==
The journal is abstracted and indexed in Science Citation Index Expanded, PubMed/MEDLINE, Scopus, EMBASE, Academic OneFile, Current Contents/Clinical Medicine, and INIS Atomindex. According to the Journal Citation Reports, the journal has a 2020 impact factor of 2.326.
