= Gádor =

Gádor, Spain
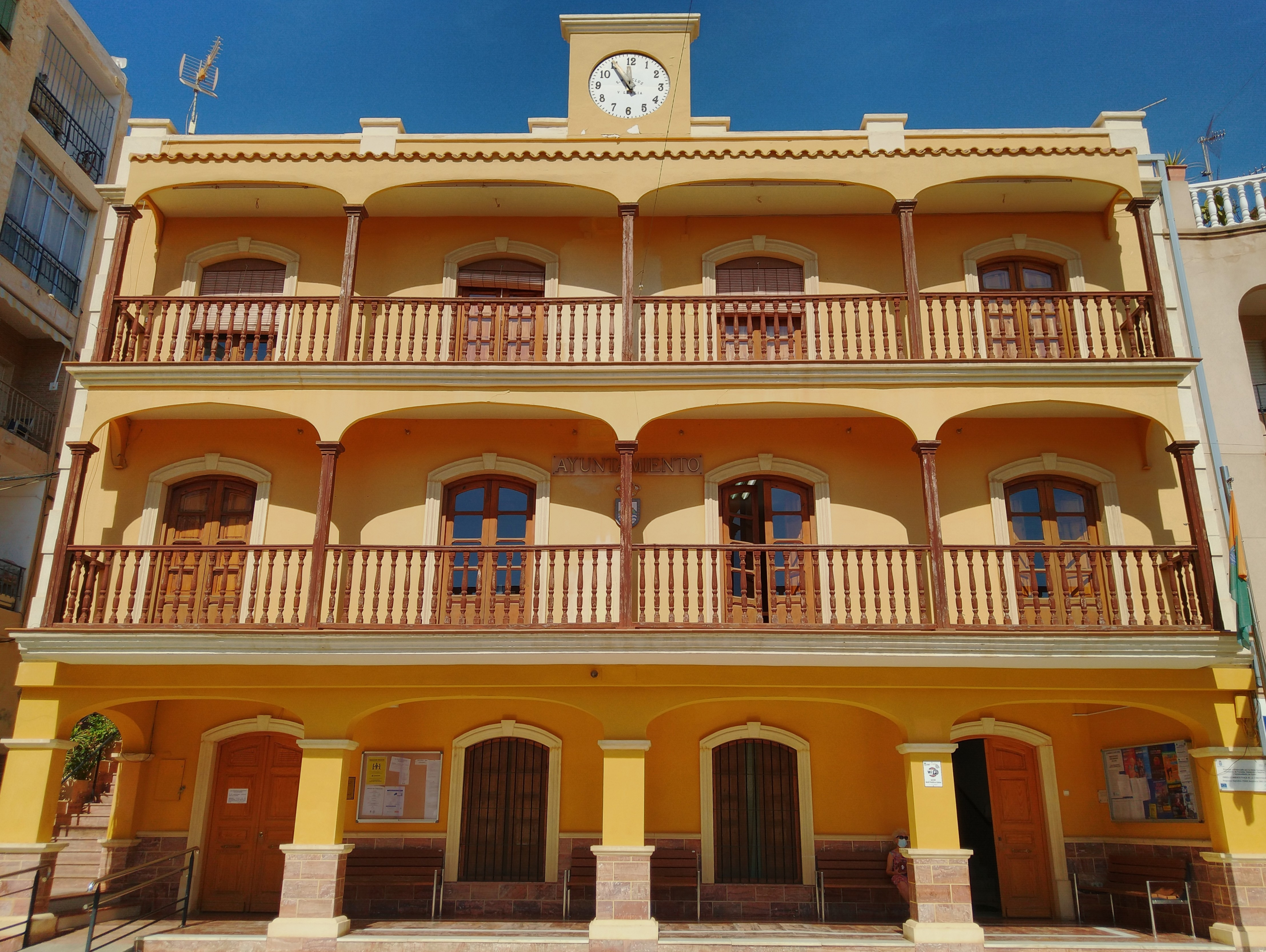
- Town hall

- Flag Coat of arms

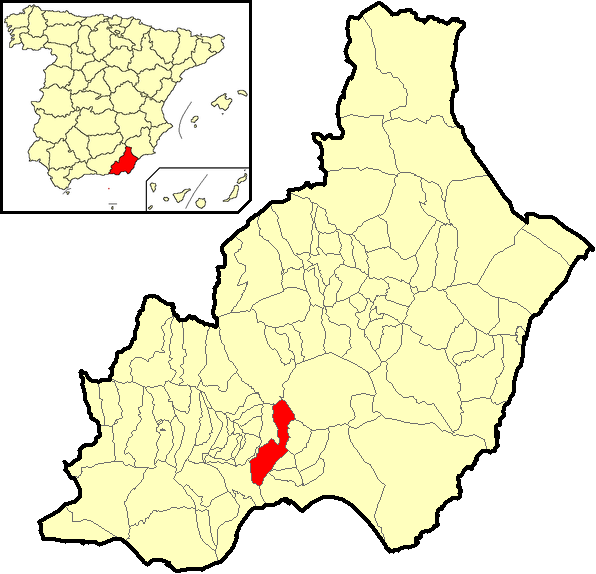
- Coordinates: 36°57′N 2°29′W
- Country: Spain
- Community: Andalusia
- Municipality: Almería

Government
  - Mayor: Eugenio Gonzálvez García (PP)

Area
  - Total: 88 km^{2} (34 sq mi)
- Elevation: 173 m (568 ft)

Population (2025-01-01)
  - Total: 3,130
  - Density: 36/km^{2} (92/sq mi)
- Time zone: UTC+1 (CET)
  - Summer (DST): UTC+2 (CEST)

Gádor is a municipality of Almería province, in the autonomous community of Andalusia, Spain. The murder of Bernardo Gonzalez Parra by Francisco Leona happened on 28 June 1910 in Gádor.

== Demographics ==
Historical population
Year	Pop.	±%
1999	2,574	—
2000	2,593	+0.7%
2001	2,649	+2.2%
2002	2,676	+1.0%
2003	2,717	+1.5%
2004	2,874	+5.8%
2005	2,933	+2.1%
Source: INE (Spain)

== See also ==
- List of municipalities in Almería
