= Manuel Blanco Romasanta =

Spanish serial killer (1809–1863)

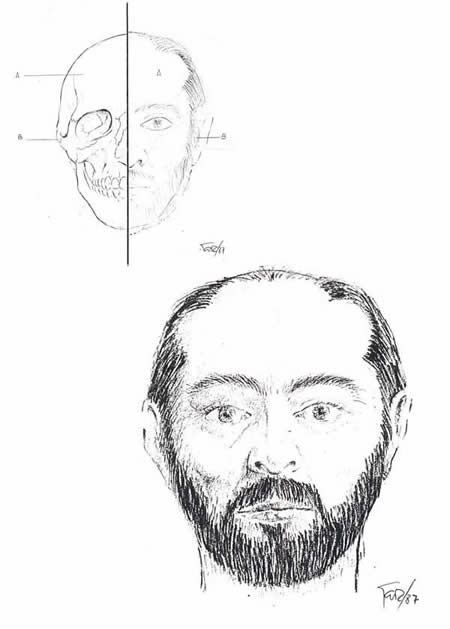
- Charcoal drawing from Romasanta's medical report
- Born: Manuela Blanco Romasanta; 18 November 1809; Regueiro, Esgos, Ourense, Galicia, Spain
- Died: 14 December 1863 (aged 54); Ceuta, Spain
- Other names: Werewolf of Allariz; Fat Extractor
- Occupations: Dressmaker; traveling salesman
- Years active: 1844–1852
- Conviction: Murder x9
- Penalty: Death by garrotte (commuted to life imprisonment)

Details
- Victims: 9 confirmed 13 confessed 20+ suspected

Manuel Blanco Romasanta (né Manuela; 18 November 1809 – 14 December 1863) was Spain's first recorded serial killer. In 1853, he admitted to thirteen murders but claimed he was not responsible because he was suffering from a curse that caused him to turn into a wolf. Although this defence was rejected at trial, Queen Isabella II commuted his death sentence to allow doctors to investigate the claim as an example of clinical lycanthropy. Blanco has become part of Spanish folklore as the Werewolf of Allariz and is also known as The Tallow Man, a nickname he earned for rendering his victims' fat to make high-quality soap.

== Background ==
According to various accounts, he was of small stature, between 1.37 and 1.49 m (4 ft 6 in and 4 ft 11 in) in height, blonde, and "tender looking." As an adult, he worked as a dressmaker and was married. He was widowed a year later but was not suspected of having had a hand in her death. Following the death of his wife in 1833, Blanco became a travelling salesman, initially in Esgos, then eventually throughout Galicia and Portugal. Blanco was also known to act as a guide for travellers crossing the mountains to Castile, Asturias, and Cantabria, which gave him further opportunities for trade.

In 1844, Blanco was charged with the murder of Vicente Fernández, the alguacil of León. Fernández was found dead after attempting to collect a debt of 600 real that Blanco owed to a supplier in Ponferrada for the purchase of merchandise. When he failed to appear, he was judged guilty by default and sentenced in absentia to 10 years imprisonment.

== Other murders and arrest ==
Fleeing from the threat of imprisonment, Blanco lived in hiding for almost a year in an abandoned shelter in Ermida. He reappeared later in public with a false passport using the name Antonio Gómez, a native of Nogueira, Portugal; and lived in the small village of Rebordechao in the district of Vilar de Barrio for at least a year. Although he helped with the harvest, he also worked as a cook, a coir maker, and as a weaver making yarn on a spinning wheel. He became friendly with the women of the village, which led the men to consider him effeminate.

Over the following years, several women and children who had hired Blanco as a guide began to disappear. Their disappearances were not noticed immediately as Blanco delivered letters to their families, advising that they had arrived well at their destinations and were settling in. However, people became suspicious when they noticed that he was selling his victim's clothing locally. Rumours began to spread that he was selling soap made from human fat.

In 1852, a complaint was finally lodged in the city of Escalona, alleging that Blanco deceived women and children into travelling with him so that he could kill them and remove their fat, which he then sold. He was arrested in September 1852, in Nombela, in the province of Toledo, and brought to trial in Allariz, in the area of Ourense. In his defence, Blanco claimed that he was afflicted with lycanthropy.

== Trial in Allariz ==
When Blanco was brought to trial, Galicia was in the middle of one of the worst famines of several that had plagued the area throughout the nineteenth century. The famine led to mass migrations and a noticeable increase in fear and anxiety. Blanco became the subject of a historical judgment: Cause Nº 1778 The Wolfman volume 36 of the courts of Allariz. The litigation, based on a claim of Lycanthropy, has never been repeated in the history of Spanish law.

Blanco admitted to thirteen murders but in his defence, he said that he had been cursed and had committed them after transforming into a wolf.

"The first time I transformed, was in the mountains of Couso. I came across two ferocious-looking wolves. I suddenly fell to the ground and began to feel convulsions, I rolled over three times, and a few seconds later I was a wolf. I was out marauding with the other two for five days, until I returned to my own body, the one you see before you today, Your Honour. The other two wolves came with me, who I thought were also wolves, changed into human form. They were from Valencia. One was called Antonio and the other Don Genaro. They too were cursed... we attacked and ate a number of people because we were hungry." — Manuel Blanco Romasanta

The prosecutor, Luciano Bastida Hernáez, asked Blanco to demonstrate the transformation for the court to which he replied that the curse only lasted for thirteen years and that he was now cured as that time had expired the previous week. In October 1852, Allariz doctors presented the court with a report on Blanco. Based heavily on phrenology, the report accused him of inventing his affliction. While noting that lycanthropy can be determined from a "visceral examination" and craneoscopia, the doctors found no causes or motives for his behaviour.

"His inclination to vice is voluntary and not forced. The subject is not insane, dim-witted or monomaniacal, nor were these [conditions] achieved while incarcerated. On the contrary, he instead turns out to be a pervert, an accomplished criminal capable of anything, cool and collected and without goodness but [acts] with free will, freedom and knowledge."

The court acquitted Blanco of four of the murders he had confessed to after forensic evidence indicated that these victims had died in real wolf attacks. He was found guilty of the other nine, the remains of which exhibited signs of butchering. On 6 April 1853, Blanco was sentenced to death by garrote with 1000 Real compensation to be paid for each victim. The court case had lasted seven months and the transcript covered more than two thousand pages which were bound in five volumes titled "Licantropia".

The case was sent for ratification to the Territorial Court in A Coruña which, after considering the case for seven months, reduced the sentence to life imprisonment. The prosecution appealed against the reduction and a new hearing was set for March 1854, which upheld the original verdict from the court in Allariz: death by garrote.

=== Confirmed victims ===
List of named victims.

- Manuela García, age 47, and her daughter Petra, 15, killed in the Sierra de San Mamede while traveling to Santander.
- Benita García Blanco, aged 34, and her son Francisco, 10, killed in Corgo de Boi while traveling to Rua cantabras.
- Antonia land, 37 years old, and her daughter Peregrina, killed while traveling to Ourense.
- Josefa García and her son José Pazos, 21 years old.
- María Dolores, 12 years old.

=== The prosecutor ===
Luciano Bastida y Hernáez gained considerable fame and prestige for his prosecution of Blanco and was made a Knight of the Royal and Distinguished Order of Charles III of Spain, the most distinguished civil award that can be granted, and was appointed to the Supreme Court. Bastida died in Ponferrada in 1872 at age 60 and is considered one of the provinces of La Rioja's "most illustrious sons" for his legal career. The bicentenary of his birth was celebrated in La Rioja on 8 January 2012.

== Commutation by Royal Decree ==
"Mr. Phillips", a French hypnotist living in London, had been following the "Werewolf of Allariz" case through the reporting in French newspapers. Phillips wrote to José de Castro y Orozco, the Spanish Minister of Justice, stating that Blanco was suffering from a monomania known as lycanthropy and was not responsible for his actions. He claimed that he had successfully treated the condition through hypnosis and asked that the execution be delayed so he could study the case. The Minister of Justice wrote to Queen Isabella II who personally commuted the death sentence to life imprisonment by Royal Order of 13 May 1854 and Blanco was transferred to a prison in Celanova.

Although there is no documentary evidence for the identity of Mr. Phillips, it is believed that he was the French physician Joseph-Pierre Durand de Gros who had been exiled to Britain and who later returned to France using the pseudonym Dr. Phillips. Durand de Gros was a significant part of the movement that led to the incorporation and assimilation of "Braidism" (viz., hypnotism à la James Braid; see) in France and his works on the influence of the mind were later developed by Sigmund Freud and Carl Jung. The "Wolfman" trial occurred at the beginning of the golden age of hypnotism.

== Death ==
The Celanova prison and its records no longer exist but it was widely believed that Blanco died within months of arriving. Locals say it was from illness, but there is also a rumour that he died after being shot by a guard who wanted to see him transform. However, a TVG documentary aired on 30 May 2009 investigated the possibility that he had died elsewhere, suggesting he had died in San Antón Castle in A Coruña. In October 2011, a "Xornadas Manuel Blanco Romasanta" (a symposium and exhibition of Blanco memorabilia) was held in Allariz where Galician researchers Félix and Cástor Castro Vicente presented evidence that Blanco had died in the prison of Ceuta on 14 December 1863. The evidence consisted of two newspaper articles, La Iberia a Liberal journal of 23 December 1863 that included a short sentence reporting that Blanco had died and La Esperanza newspaper dated 21 December 1863 which reported on its front page:

"In Ceuta prison, the unfortunately famous Manuel Blanco Romasanta, known in all Spain as the werewolf as a consequence of his atrocities and misdeeds and who was sentenced to prison by the Court in La Coruña, died in that place on 14 of this month being the victim of stomach cancer."

== Popular culture ==
- El Bosque del Lobo (The Ancines Woods) is a 1970 Spanish horror film produced and directed by Pedro Olea and starring José Luis López Vázquez. The film is based on the novel El bosque de Ancines by Carlos Martínez-Barbeito.
- Romasanta (also titled Werewolf Hunter – The Legend of Romasanta) is a 2004 Anglo-Spanish horror film produced by Fantastic Factory, directed by Paco Plaza and starring Julian Sands, Elsa Pataky, and John Sharian. The film is based on a script by Alfredo Conde, who is a descendant of one of the doctors involved in the original Werewolf of Allariz court case. Conde went on to write the fictional novel The Uncertain Memoirs of a Galician Wolfman: Romasanta.
- In the 2014 documentary 10 Most Evil Serial Killers from BayView Entertainment, Manuel Blanco Romasanta is portrayed by British horror actor Nathan Head.
- Romasanta may also have influenced the 1985 novel Perfume by German author Patrick Süskind.
- The Galician group Luar na Lubre made a song, Cantar de Romasanta, that explains the story.

== See also ==
- List of serial killers by country
