= Sack Man =

Type of mythical character said to carry naughty children away in bags

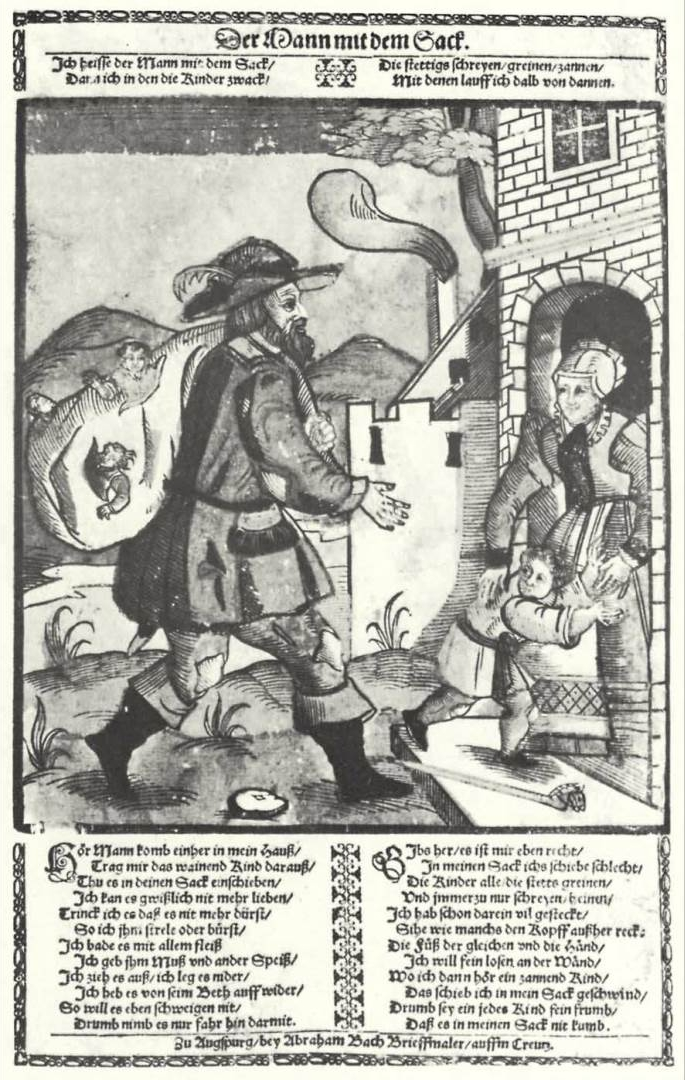
Der Mann mit dem Sack (the man with the bag) by Abraham Bach der Ältere.

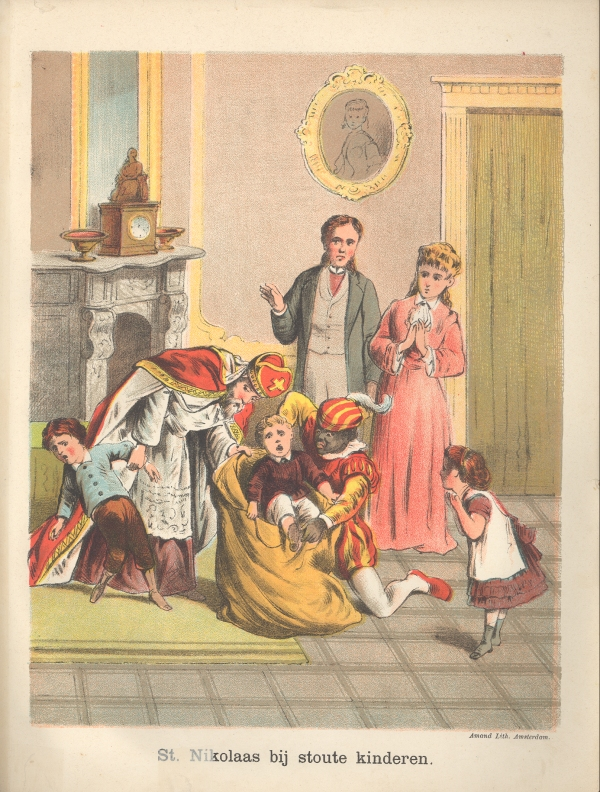
Sinterklaas and Zwarte Piet with naughty children, 1885

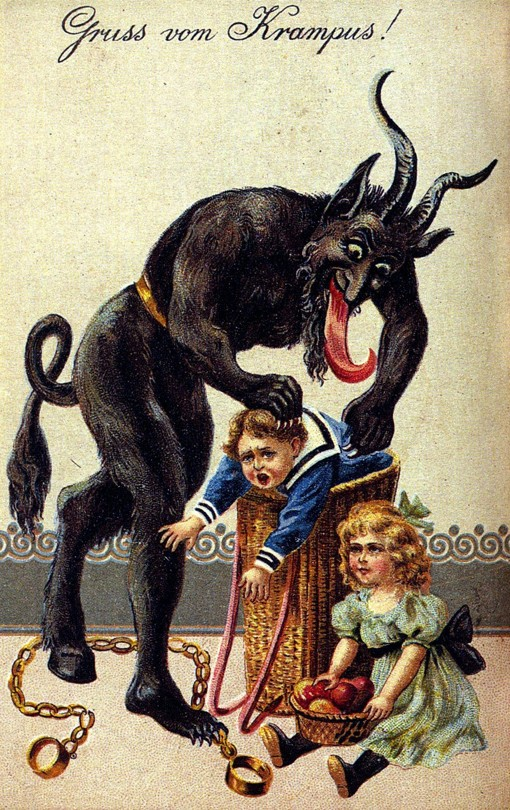
Gruss vom Krampus, ca. 1900

The Sack Man (also called the Bag Man or Man with the Bag/Sack) is a figure similar to the bogeyman, portrayed as a man with a sack on his back who carries naughty children away.

== Regional traditions ==
Variants of this figure appear all over the world, particularly in the Americas, where it is referred to as el Hombre del costal, el hombre del saco, or in Portuguese, o homem do saco (all of which mean 'the sack/bag man'), and Eastern Europe. Similar legends are found in Haiti and some countries in Asia.

=== Iberia and Latin America ===
In Spain, el hombre del saco is usually depicted as a mean and impossibly ugly and skinny old man who eats the misbehaving children he collects. The crime of Gádor gave rise to this term because the kidnappers used a gunny sack to carry with the children.

In Brazil, o homem do saco is portrayed as a tall and imposing adult male, usually in the form of a vagrant, who carries a sack on his back, and collects mean disobedient children to sell them.

In Chile, Argentina, and particularly in the Southern and Austral Zones, hee is mostly known as el Viejo del Saco or el Hombre de La Bolsa ('the Old Man with the Bag') who walks around the neighbourhood every day around supper time. This character is not considered or perceived as a mythical or fantastic creature by children. Instead, he is recognised as an insane murderer that somehow has been accepted by society which allows him to take a child that has been given to him willingly by disappointed parents or any child that is not home by sundown or supper time. In Honduras and Mexico, misbehaving children fear el Roba Chicos, ('the child-snatcher'), which is very similar to Hombre del Saco.

=== Eastern Europe and the Caucasus ===
In Armenia and Georgia, children are threatened by the "Bag Man" who carries a bag and kidnaps those who do not behave. In Hungary, the local bogeyman, the mumus, is known as zsákos ember, literally "the person with a sack". In Poland, children are frightened by the bebok, babok, or bobok, who is also portrayed as a man with a sack. In the Czech Republic and Slovakia, a similar creature is known: bubák. It is a creature without a typical form, connected with darkness or scary places, making children fear but not taking them away usually. The character of čert, the devil, is used for that instead ("Don't be naughty or čert will take you away!"). In Russia, Ukraine, and Belarus, buka (бука), babay (бабай), or babayka (бабайка) is used to keep children in bed or stop them from misbehaving. babay means 'old man' in Tatar.

=== Asia ===
In North India, children are sometimes threatened with the Bori Baba or "Father Sack" who carries a sack in which he places children he captures. A similar being, "Abu Kees" (ابو كيس, lit. 'the Man with a Bag') appears in Lebanon.

In Turkey, Kharqyt (Turkish: Harkıt means 'Sack Man'; he is also called Öcü, Böcü, or Torbalı) is portrayed as a man with a sack on his back who carries naughty children away to eat or sell them.

In Korea, mangtae yeonggam (망태 영감) an old man (yeonggam) who carries a mesh sack (mangtae) to put his kidnapped children in, thus, 'Old Man with a Sack'. In some regions, mangtae yeonggam is replaced by mangtae halmeom (망태 할멈), an old woman with a mesh sack.

In Vietnam, misbehaving children are told that ông ba bị (in the North; literally 'mister three-bags') or ông kẹ (in the South) will come in the night and take them away.

In Sri Lanka, among the Sinhalese people, elders frighten misbehaving children with Goni Billa, (translates roughly as 'sack kidnapper') a scary man carrying a sack who arrives day or night to capture and keep children. During the 1987–1989 JVP insurrection, the term was used to describe masked informants.

=== Africa ===
In the Western Cape folklore of South Africa, Antjie Somers is a bogeyman who catches naughty children in a bag slung over his shoulder. Although the name is that of a female, Antjie Somers is traditionally a male figure (often an escaped slave who fled persecution by cross-dressing).

== In association with Christmas ==
Several countries contrast their version of the sack man with the benign sack carrier Father Christmas. In the Netherlands and Flanders, Zwarte Piet (Dutch for 'Black Pete') is a servant of Sinterklaas, who delivers bags of presents on 5 December and takes naughty kids back to Spain in the now empty bags. In some stories, the Zwarte Piets themselves were kidnapped as kids, and the kidnapped kids make up the next generation of Zwarte Piets. In Switzerland, the corresponding figure is known as Schmutzli (derived from Butzli) in German, or Père Fouettard in French.

A similar figure, Krampus, appears in the folklore of Alpine countries, sometimes depicted with a sack or washtub to carry children away. In Bulgaria, children are sometimes told that a dark scary monster-like person called Torbalan (Bulgarian: Торбалан, which comes from торба [torba], meaning a sack, so his name means 'man with a sack') will come and kidnap them with his large sack if they misbehave. He can be seen as the antipode of the Christmas figure Santa Claus (Bulgarian: Дядо Коледа, Dyado Koleda; corresponding to Father Christmas).

In Haiti, the Tonton Macoute (Haitian Creole: Tonton Makout, lit. 'Uncle Gunnysack') is a giant, and a counterpart of Father Christmas, renowned for abducting bad children by putting them in his knapsack. During the dictatorship of Papa Doc Duvalier, certain Haitian secret policemen were given the name Tontons Macoutes because they were said also to make people disappear.

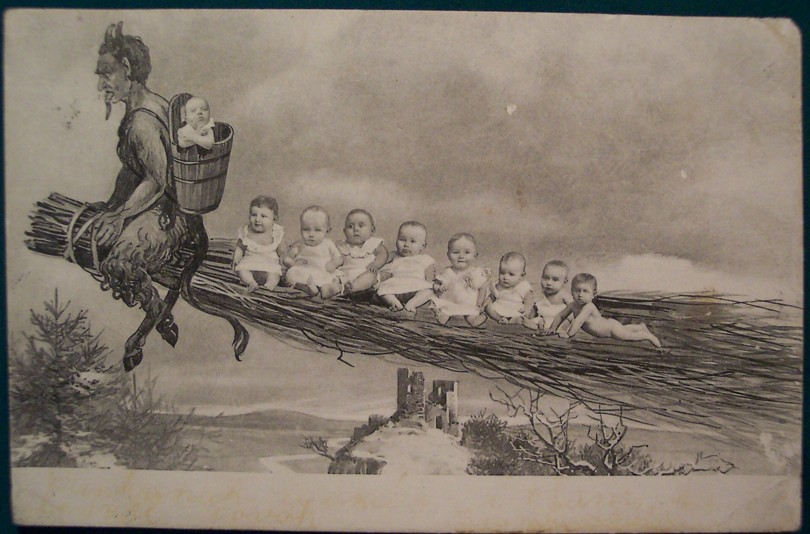
Krampus takes the children

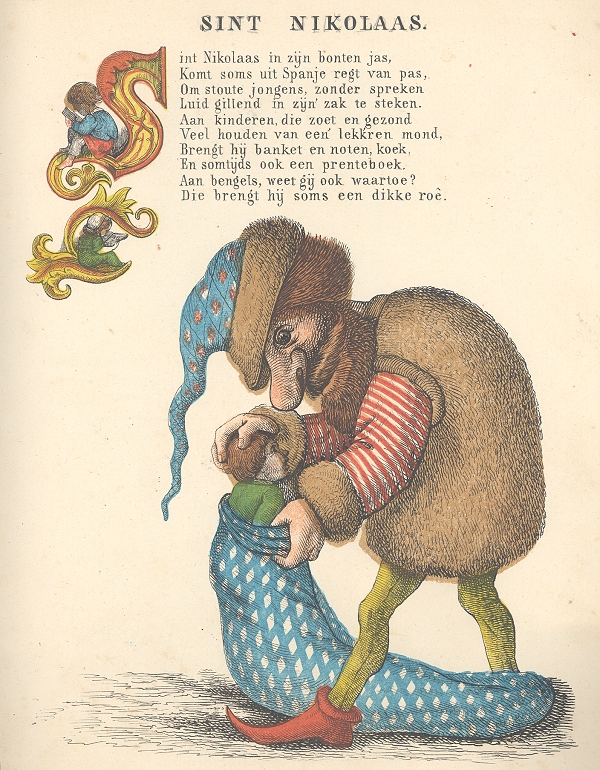
Sinterklaas

== See also ==
- Babay
- Coco
- Child Catcher
- Krampus
- Madam Koi Koi
- The Silbón
- Père Fouettard
- Sacamantecas
- Tonton Macoute
