= List of kidnappings (1900–1929) =

The following is a list of kidnappings in the first half of the 20th century, summarizing the events of each case, including instances of celebrity abductions, claimed hoaxes, suspected kidnappings, extradition abductions, and mass kidnappings.

== List ==
Date	Image	Victim(s)	Abductor(s)	Location	Age of victim(s)	Outcome	Notes
18 December 1900		Edward Cudahy Jr.	Pat Crowe (accused)	(United States) Omaha, Nebraska, U.S.	15	Released	The son of a business magnate who was kidnapped and held for $25,000 ransom, with his abductor, Pat Crowe, releasing him after the ransom was paid. After being found not guilty at trial, he made a living as a lecturer and author.
21 August 1901		Ellen Maria Stone	Internal Macedonian Revolutionary Organization	Bansko, Bulgaria	Unknown	Released	In what is known as the Miss Stone Affair, two women were kidnapped by revolutionaries and released a year later.
21 August 1901		Katerina Cilka	Internal Macedonian Revolutionary Organization	Bansko, Bulgaria	Unknown	Released	In what is known as the Miss Stone Affair, two women were kidnapped by revolutionaries and released a year later.
12 May 1902		Margaret Taylor	Clara Taylor	(United States) Cincinnati, Ohio, U.S.	c. 1	Rescued	Kidnapped by her aunt in 1902, Taylor was located in Bordighera, Italy; she was later returned to the United States at the age of 10.
27 May 1903		Gloria Whalen	Unknown	Collingwood, Ontario, Canada	13	Murdered	Gloria (Glory) Whalen was kidnapped and killed by an unknown perpetrator.
18 May 1904		Ion Perdicaris	Bandits sent by Mulai Ahmed er Raisuli	Tangier, Morocco	64	Released	Perdicaris and his stepson, Cromwell Varley, were kidnapped by Mulai Ahmed er Raisuli in Tangier. US Secretary of State John Hay declared, "This government wants Perdicaris alive or Raisuli dead." The two men were released alive upon payment of a ransom.
18 May 1904		Cromwell Varley	Bandits sent by Mulai Ahmed er Raisuli	Tangier, Morocco	Unknown	Released	Perdicaris and his stepson, Cromwell Varley, were kidnapped by Mulai Ahmed er Raisuli in Tangier. US Secretary of State John Hay declared, "This government wants Perdicaris alive or Raisuli dead." The two men were released alive upon payment of a ransom.
19 March 1906		Ed Johnson	A lynch mob	(United States) Chattanooga, Tennessee, U.S.	Unknown	Murdered	Johnson, an African-American porter, was wrongly convicted of the rape of a white woman named Nevada Taylor. After his death sentence was stayed pending an appeal to the U.S. Supreme Court, an angry mob dragged him out of his cell, hanged him from the Walnut Street Bridge and shot him around 55 times while he was hanging. The lynching resulted in a landmark Supreme Court case, United States v. Shipp, pertaining to local law enforcement's failure to protect Johnson.
1906		Ollie Creamer	Unknown	Cape Tormentine, New Brunswick, Canada	5	Never found	Two siblings who were kidnapped from the village of Cape Tormentine in the summer of 1906. Their bodies were never found and their ultimate fate remains unknown.
1906		Ralph Creamer	Unknown	Cape Tormentine, New Brunswick, Canada	3	Never found	Two siblings who were kidnapped from the village of Cape Tormentine in the summer of 1906. Their bodies were never found and their ultimate fate remains unknown.
12 June 1907		Walter Lamana	New Orleans Italian Mafia	(United States) New Orleans, Louisiana, U.S.	8	Murdered	Lamana was kidnapped and murdered by members of the New Orleans Italian Mafia. His body was later found in a swamp. Two of the participants in his abduction and murder, Leonardo and Nicolina Gebbia, received the death penalty; four others received life imprisonment.
26 October 1908		Edward G. English	Leo Bezeman	(United States) Mount Vernon, Washington, U.S.	55	Escaped	English was kidnapped and held for a $5,000 ransom in October 1908. He escaped by loosening the chain used to restrain him and crawling to safety.
18 March 1909		William Whitla	James and Helen Boyle	(United States) Sharon, Pennsylvania, U.S.	8	Released	Whitla was the son of a prominent Pennsylvania attorney; he was kidnapped via guile from his school by two men. A ransom note was delivered to his parents hours later, demanding a sum of $10,000 for his release and closing with the warning "Dead men tell no tales. Neither do dead boys". Via instruction, Whitla's father delivered the ransom to a drugstore, and Whitla was released on 22 March. James Boyle was later sentenced to life imprisonment for the kidnapping; his wife was sentenced to twenty-five years' imprisonment for aiding and abetting.
1909		George Cove	Unknown	(United States) The Bronx, New York, U.S.	Unknown	Released	Canadian inventor who was kidnapped by unknown assailants, who offered him $25,000 in exchange for him to stop promoting his devices. He refused and was later released without harm. Cove accused a former investor of orchestrating the kidnapping, but nothing came out of it and his business soon flunked.
1910		Thomas Bedden	Albert Fish	United States	19	Murdered	Thomas Bedden was kidnapped by and is known to have been murdered by serial killer Albert Fish.
28 June 1910		Bernardo Parra	Francisco Leona	Gádor, Almería, Spain	7	Murdered	Parra was abducted by local healer Francisco Leona at the request of Francisco "the Moor" Ortega. At the time, it was believed that drinking the blood of a child could cure tuberculosis, prompting Ortega to pay Leona 3000 reales to find him a child. Leona and another man abducted Parra and carried him away in a gunny sack, giving rise to the term El Sacamantecas, and murdered him.
8 April 1911		Elsie Paroubek	Unknown	(United States) Chicago, Illinois, US	5	Murdered	Paroubek was a Czech-American girl who disappeared while walking alone to her aunt's house nearby in Chicago. Her body was found a month later in a drainage ditch. Several people, including Paroubek's father and the police in charge of the investigation, suspected Roma (who had several camps in the area at the time) were involved.
10 February 1912		Teresita Guitart Congost	Enriqueta Martí	Barcelona, Spain	5	Rescued	Gongost was abducted by Spanish child serial killer and kidnapper Enriqueta Martí on 10 February 1912, becoming Martí's last known victim. On 27 February, two Ribot agents searching for Congost found her in a flat, along with a girl called Angelita, and returned her to her parents.
23 August 1912		Bobby Dunbar	Unknown	(United States) St. Landry Parish, Louisiana, U.S.	4	Unknown	Bobby Dunbar disappeared at age 4 near Swayze Lake. After an eight-month nationwide search, investigators found a child the Dunbar parents claimed was their son in the household of William Cantwell Walters of Mississippi. He was convicted of kidnapping. Walters told the police the boy was given to him by his mother, and that his name was Charles Bruce Anderson, known as Bruce. The boy's mother, Julia Anderson, affirmed Walters' account. In 2004, further investigation by "Dunbar's" granddaughter led to conclusive DNA proof that the child in Walters' custody was not the Dunbars' son. Walters had been wrongfully convicted for taking care of Charles Bruce Anderson. Dunbar was never found and his disappearance has never been conclusively solved.
1914		Webb Miller	Mark Morton	(United States) Wheaton, Illinois, U.S.	23	Released	Webb was beaten, then kidnapped by businessman Mark Morton as he attempted to conduct a press interview in the summer of 1914. He was rescued after Morton crashed his vehicle.
17 August 1915		Leo Frank	Knights of Mary Phagan	(United States) Milledgeville State Penitentiary, Georgia, U.S.	31	Murdered	Jewish man wrongly convicted of raping and killing a 13-year-old white girl named Mary Phagan. After Frank's death sentence was commuted to life imprisonment, a group of vigilantes calling themselves "The Knights of Mary Phagan" abducted him from prison and summarily hanged him.
15 May 1916		Jesse Washington	A lynch mob	(United States) Waco, Texas, U.S.	17	Murdered	Washington, an African-American farmhand, was accused of murdering a white woman named Lucy Fryer. After pleading guilty to the crime, he was dragged from the courthouse by a crowd of angry observers who paraded him across town in chains and beat and stabbed him before hanging him from a tree, cutting off his fingers, castrating him, and finally burning him alive over a period of two hours.
12 July 1917		1,300 striking mine workers	Phelps Dodge Corporation	(United States) Bisbee, Arizona, U.S.	Various	Deported	1,300 striking American mine workers were kidnapped and deported. Deportations began on 12 July 1917, in Bisbee, Arizona.
9 November 1917		Eleven Industrial Workers of the World	Tulsa Police Department and a lynch mob	(United States) Tulsa, Oklahoma, U.S.	Numerous	Survived	On November 5, 1917, the Tulsa Police Department raided the local Industrial Workers of the World (IWW) headquarters and arrested 11 men. After a trial November 8, the men were loaded into vehicles, taken to the edge of town, and tarred and feathered by a group of men affiliated with the Knights of Liberty that included W. Tate Brady. Local media praised the incident, while it was largely denounced by national media.
24 April 1918		Abram Dobryi	Ukrainian People's Army and the Kyiv police force	Kyiv, Ukraine	c. 51	Released	A prominent banker, Dobryi was kidnapped from his apartment by members of the Sich Riflemen and the Kyiv police force. He was detained under armed guard in the city's Grand Hotel. He was released after paying a ransom of 100,000 rubles.
1 September 1918		John Owen Donaldson	German Empire	France	31	Escaped	An American World War I flying ace credited with seven aerial victories. Donaldson was felled in aerial combat by Theodor Quandt on 1 September 1918; although captured, he and another prisoner escaped the following day.
11 November 1919		Wesley Everest	A lynch mob	(United States) Centralia, Washington, U.S.	28	Murdered	Everest, a member of Industrial Workers of the World, was one of the gunmen in the Centralia Massacre. Arrested fleeing the scene, he was dragged from prison later that night by a lynch mob who hanged him from the Mellen Street Bridge. Some accounts state he was castrated before his death, but modern scholarship casts doubt on this.
4 February 1920		Geneva Hardman	Will Lockett	(United States) Lexington, Kentucky, U.S.	10	Murdered	Geneva Hardman was kidnapped and murdered.
31 July 1920		Georges Bessarabo	Héra Mirtel	Paris, France	Unknown	Murdered	Mirtel shot her husband dead and sent the corpse via train from Gare de l'Est.
1921		Giuseppe Varotta	Blackhand gang members	Kingdom of Italy	5	Murdered	Varotta was kidnapped on 24 May 1921 in front of his home and found dead in a river on 21 June 1921 after being killed.
6 April 1922		Pauline Picard	Unknown	Saint-Rivoal, France	2	Died	A toddler who disappeared from her family's farm in Saint-Rivoal, France. Picard's mutilated body was discovered the following month. Contemporary reports differ as to whether the child was murdered or her death was accidental.
1923		Mei Zhanchun	Unknown	Hankou, China	58–59	Murdered	Zhanchun (born Pascal Angelicus Melotto) was an Italian-born Roman Catholic priest of the Franciscan Order. He was kidnapped for ransom in 1923 and murdered three months later. Zhanchun is one of the earliest martyrs in China.
21 May 1924		Bobby Franks	Nathan Leopold and Richard Loeb	(United States) Chicago, Illinois, U.S.	14	Murdered	Franks was abducted and beaten to death by Leopold and Loeb, two wealthy students who wished to commit the perfect crime. The two killers were sentenced to life imprisonment after a sensational trial at which they were defended by Clarence Darrow. Loeb was killed in prison, but Leopold was released after serving 33 years.
15 March 1925		Madge Oberholtzer	D. C. Stephenson	(United States) Indianapolis, Indiana, U.S.	29	Released, but died from assault-related injuries	White woman who was abducted and forcefully raped by a Grand Dragon of the Ku Klux Klan, which later led to her dying from injuries received during the assault. The case led to a steep decline in KKK memberships in the state of Indiana.
1926		Aimee Semple McPherson	Unknown	(United States) Venice Beach, California, U.S.	36	Escaped	American Christian evangelist Aimee Semple McPherson disappeared on May 18, 1926 from Venice Beach, California, after going swimming. She reappeared five weeks later in Mexico after claiming that she was kidnapped.
15 August 1926		Raymond Byrd	Floyd Willard (alleged) et al	(United States) Wythe County, Virginia, U.S.	31	Murdered	An African-American farmhand, Byrd was the victim of a racially motivated lynching sourcing from his engaging in sexual relations with three white sisters, one of whom was under the legal age of consent. Although over eighty individuals are believed to have been involved in Byrd's abduction and murder, the only individual to be indicted by a grand jury for the crime, Floyd Willard, was acquitted by an all-white jury after just ten minutes of deliberation on July 19, 1927.
1927		Lea Niako	Unknown	Portugal	19	Escaped	German dancer and actress who was abducted by a stalker while filming the film Fátima Milagrosa (1928). She was taken to the Boca do Inferno chasm in Cascais, but escaped upon arrival.
1927		Abraham Scharlin	Unknown	(United States) New York, U.S.	40	Survived	A real estate tycoon was kidnapped in New York. Detective John Cordes was honoured with a medal of honour.
15 December 1927		Marion Parker	William Hickman	(United States) Los Angeles, California, U.S.	12	Murdered	Parker, the daughter of a Los Angeles banker, was kidnapped and killed by William Hickman. A few days after receiving a small ransom, Hickman was arrested and tried. He was convicted and sentenced to death. On 19 October 1928, he was executed for his crime.
February – 16 May 1928		Lewis Winslow	Gordon Stewart Northcott	(United States) Los Angeles, California, US	12	Murdered	At least three children – Lewis and Nelson Winslow and an unnamed Mexican boy (possibly Alvin Gothea) – were abducted by Gordon Northcott and accomplices, who sexually abused and killed them on Northcott's chicken farm in Wineville. One of Northcott's accomplices also claimed responsibility for the abduction and murder of Walter Collins, a 9-year-old boy who disappeared in 1928, and Northcott confessed to five more murders, but none of these claims were proved.
February – 16 May 1928		Nelson Winslow	Gordon Stewart Northcott	(United States) Los Angeles, California, US	10	Murdered	At least three children – Lewis and Nelson Winslow and an unnamed Mexican boy (possibly Alvin Gothea) – were abducted by Gordon Northcott and accomplices, who sexually abused and killed them on Northcott's chicken farm in Wineville. One of Northcott's accomplices also claimed responsibility for the abduction and murder of Walter Collins, a 9-year-old boy who disappeared in 1928, and Northcott confessed to five more murders, but none of these claims were proved.
February – 16 May 1928		Unknown boy	Gordon Stewart Northcott	(United States) Los Angeles, California, US	Unknown	Murdered	At least three children – Lewis and Nelson Winslow and an unnamed Mexican boy (possibly Alvin Gothea) – were abducted by Gordon Northcott and accomplices, who sexually abused and killed them on Northcott's chicken farm in Wineville. One of Northcott's accomplices also claimed responsibility for the abduction and murder of Walter Collins, a 9-year-old boy who disappeared in 1928, and Northcott confessed to five more murders, but none of these claims were proved.
28 May 1928		Grace Budd	Albert Fish	(United States) New York City, U.S.	10	Murdered	Fish, a sadomasochistic serial killer and pedophile, tricked the Budd family into allowing him to take their 10-year-old daughter Grace to a party that evening. He then drove her to his rented cottage in the Irvington neighbourhood, where he strangled her and dismembered and ate her body.
18 September 1928		George Gill Jamieson	Myles Fukunaga	Waikīkī, Hawaii	10	Murdered	Jamieson was the son of a Hawaiian banker who was kidnapped and murdered in September 1928. Although a ransom was paid, Jamieson was murdered. The perpetrator, Myles Fukunaga, was subsequently executed in 1929 at age 20.
June 1929		W. B. Kinne	Four armed men	(United States) Idaho, U.S.	55	Escaped	W. B. Kinne, an American Republican politician and Lieutenant Governor of Idaho was kidnapped in June 1929 and later escaped.
