= List of people executed in the United States in 1930 =

One hundred and fifty-five people, one hundred and fifty-three male and two female, were executed in the United States in 1930, one hundred and six by electrocution, forty-eight by hanging, and one by gas chamber.

== List of people executed in the United States in 1930 ==
No.	Date of execution	Name	Age of person			Gender	Ethnicity	State	Method	Ref.
No.	Date of execution	Name	At execution	At offense	Age difference	Gender	Ethnicity	State	Method	Ref.
1	January 2, 1930	Frank Kowalski	25	24	1	Male	White	New York	Electrocution	
2	January 2, 1930	Arthur Brown	34	23	1	Male	White	New York	Electrocution	
3	January 3, 1930	Anthony Brown	31	29	2	Male	White	California	Hanging	
4	January 3, 1930	Louis Lazarus	38	37	1	Male	White	California	Hanging	
5	January 3, 1930	Roy E. Stokes	24	22	2	Male	White	California	Hanging	
6	January 3, 1930	Henry Wilson	21	Unknown	Unknown	Male	Black	Louisiana	Hanging	
7	January 9, 1930	John E. Schlager	32	31	1	Male	White	New York	Electrocution	
8	January 10, 1930	Walter E. Burke	33	31	2	Male	White	California	Hanging	
9	January 10, 1930	James Henry Gregg	34	32	2	Male	White	California	Hanging	
10	January 10, 1930	Edward Ives	50	49	1	Male	White	Colorado	Hanging	
11	January 10, 1930	Joseph Marrazzo	27	Unknown	Unknown	Male	White	New Jersey	Electrocution	
12	January 10, 1930	Frank Joseph Pannatiere	26	Unknown	Unknown	Male	White	New Jersey	Electrocution	
13	January 17, 1930	James Gleason	30	28	2	Male	White	California	Hanging	
14	January 24, 1930	Silena Gilmore	34	34	0	Female	Black	Alabama	Electrocution	
15	January 24, 1930	Ben Evers	22	21	1	Male	Black	Arkansas	Electrocution	
16	January 27, 1930	John Ellen	41	39	2	Male	Black	Georgia	Electrocution	
17	January 30, 1930	Michael Sclafonia	20	19	1	Male	White	New York	Electrocution	
18	January 30, 1930	Frank Plaia	20	19	1	Male	White	New York	Electrocution	
19	January 31, 1930	John Jackson	55	Unknown	Unknown	Male	Black	Maryland	Hanging	
20	January 31, 1930	Lawrence Mabry	19	17	2	Male	White	Missouri	Hanging	
21	February 3, 1930	Giuseppe Guida	37	36	1	Male	White	Pennsylvania	Electrocution	
22	February 10, 1930	James Chandler	48	46	2	Male	Black	California	Hanging	
23	February 14, 1930	James Barker	22	Unknown	Unknown	Male	Black	Georgia	Electrocution	
24	February 14, 1930	Ray Evans	21	20	1	Male	Black	North Carolina	Electrocution	
25	February 14, 1930	John Jones	20	18	2	Male	Black	Tennessee	Electrocution	
26	February 20, 1930	John Fields	23	Unknown	Unknown	Male	Black	Virginia	Electrocution	
27	February 21, 1930	Eva Dugan	51	48	3	Female	White	Arizona	Hanging	
28	February 21, 1930	Frank A. DiBattista	26	25	1	Male	White	Connecticut	Hanging	
29	February 21, 1930	Edmond Kelly	27	26	1	Male	Black	Georgia	Electrocution	
30	February 21, 1930	John Washington	31	30	1	Male	Black	Louisiana	Hanging	
31	February 21, 1930	Robert V. Lewis Sr.	35	33	2	Male	White	Mississippi	Hanging	
32	February 28, 1930	James Howard Snook	50	49	1	Male	White	Ohio	Electrocution	
33	March 7, 1930	Refugio Macias	43	42	1	Male	Hispanic	Arizona	Hanging	
34	March 7, 1930	Irkson Webb	Unknown	Unknown	Unknown	Male	Black	Louisiana	Hanging	
35	March 7, 1930	Joe Wynn	Unknown	Unknown	Unknown	Male	Black	Louisiana	Hanging	
36	March 10, 1930	George Austin Brownfield	54	54	0	Male	White	Wyoming	Hanging	
37	March 13, 1930	Bishop Adams	41	40	1	Male	Black	Texas	Electrocution	
38	March 14, 1930	Alphonse Dan Reilly	22	21	1	Male	White	California	Hanging	
39	March 14, 1930	Carey Gunn	20	20	0	Male	Black	Tennessee	Electrocution	
40	March 19, 1930	Boss Funderburk	43	Unknown	Unknown	Male	Black	Florida	Electrocution	
41	March 21, 1930	Mack Brown	27	26	1	Male	Black	Arkansas	Electrocution	
42	March 21, 1930	John Green	28	27	1	Male	Black	Arkansas	Electrocution	
43	March 21, 1930	Renty Screven	50	Unknown	Unknown	Male	Black	Georgia	Electrocution	
44	March 21, 1930	James Britt	42	41	1	Male	Black	Indiana	Electrocution	
45	March 28, 1930	Louis Galvano	20	19	1	Male	White	Delaware	Hanging	
46	March 31, 1930	Ralph Russell Sloat	29	28	1	Male	White	Pennsylvania	Electrocution	
47	April 4, 1930	John Macon	34	33	1	Male	Black	North Carolina	Electrocution	
48	April 11, 1930	Jack Jarvis	28	26	2	Male	White	Alabama	Electrocution	
49	April 11, 1930	Aaron Woodward	35	33	2	Male	Black	Illinois	Electrocution	
50	April 17, 1930	Robert Mangum	22	Unknown	Unknown	Male	Black	North Carolina	Electrocution	
51	April 17, 1930	Henry Colin Campbell Close	61	60	1	Male	White	New Jersey	Electrocution	
52	April 29, 1930	Eli Truesdale	30	Unknown	Unknown	Male	Black	South Carolina	Electrocution	
53	May 9, 1930	August Vogel	25	25	0	Male	White	Illinois	Electrocution	
54	May 9, 1930	James Ernest Brumfield	23	22	1	Male	Black	North Carolina	Electrocution	
55	May 9, 1930	Walter E. Crabtree	35	35	0	Male	White	West Virginia	Hanging	
56	May 14, 1930	Charles Aragon	25	23	2	Male	Native American	Wyoming	Hanging	
57	May 16, 1930	Armando Boltares	24	23	1	Male	Hispanic	California	Hanging	
58	May 16, 1930	Ossie Moore	24	24	0	Male	Black	South Carolina	Electrocution	
59	May 16, 1930	George Washington	22	22	0	Male	Black	South Carolina	Electrocution	
60	May 22, 1930	Jordan Scott	32	31	1	Male	Black	Texas	Electrocution	
61	May 23, 1930	James Spivey	26	25	1	Male	White	North Carolina	Electrocution	
62	May 26, 1930	John Richardson	22	22	0	Male	White	Ohio	Electrocution	
63	May 28, 1930	Harold I. Weiss	32	31	1	Male	White	Colorado	Hanging	
64	May 29, 1930	Stephen Ziolkowski	24	Unknown	Unknown	Male	White	New York	Electrocution	
65	June 2, 1930	Robert H. White	41	39	2	Male	White	Nevada	Gas chamber	
66	June 5, 1930	Andrew Jackson Hawkins	33	31	2	Male	Black	District of Columbia	Electrocution	
67	June 6, 1930	William Pruitt Jr.	24	22	2	Male	White	Texas	Electrocution	
68	June 13, 1930	Richard Edmonds	36	34	2	Male	Black	Kentucky	Electrocution	
69	June 13, 1930	Ballard E. Ratcliffe	41	39	2	Male	White	Kentucky	Electrocution	
70	June 13, 1930	Lee Akers	17	16	1	Male	Black	Ohio	Electrocution	
71	June 20, 1930	Jack Bowen	30	Unknown	Unknown	Male	Black	Alabama	Electrocution	
72	June 20, 1930	Edgar Harris	28	Unknown	Unknown	Male	Black	Alabama	Electrocution	
73	June 20, 1930	Roy Lee Miles	29	27	2	Male	Black	Alabama	Electrocution	
74	June 20, 1930	Ambrosia Alford	30	29	1	Male	Black	Arkansas	Electrocution	
75	June 20, 1930	Lucius Jolley	23	Unknown	Unknown	Male	Black	Georgia	Electrocution	
76	June 20, 1930	Leonard Jones	30	Unknown	Unknown	Male	Black	Louisiana	Hanging	
77	June 20, 1930	James E. Litteral	43	42	1	Male	White	Ohio	Electrocution	
78	June 23, 1930	John L. Pierce	31	30	1	Male	Black	Pennsylvania	Electrocution	
79	June 24, 1930	Ray Coleman	29	27	2	Male	White	South Carolina	Electrocution	
80	June 24, 1930	Paul B. Johnson	31	30	1	Male	White	South Carolina	Electrocution	
81	June 27, 1930	Emory Van Dusen	24	Unknown	Unknown	Male	Black	Georgia	Electrocution	
82	June 28, 1930	George Williams	68	67	1	Male	White	Ohio	Electrocution	
83	June 30, 1930	Martin Avery	19	18	1	Male	Black	Pennsylvania	Electrocution	
84	June 30, 1930	William Henry Sled	31	30	1	Male	Black	Pennsylvania	Electrocution	
85	June 30, 1930	Frank Tauza	44	44	0	Male	White	Pennsylvania	Electrocution	
86	July 7, 1930	James Flori	25	24	1	Male	White	Pennsylvania	Electrocution	
87	July 10, 1930	Ralph Emmerson Fleagle	49	47	2	Male	White	Colorado	Hanging	
88	July 11, 1930	Lawrence L. Dull	25	24	1	Male	White	Ohio	Electrocution	
89	July 11, 1930	Preston Rae Clark	39	36	3	Male	White	Washington	Hanging	
90	July 17, 1930	Alexander Bogdanoff	32	31	1	Male	White	New York	Electrocution	
91	July 17, 1930	Stephen Grzechowiak	29	28	1	Male	White	New York	Electrocution	
92	July 17, 1930	Max Rybarczyk	31	30	1	Male	White	New York	Electrocution	
93	July 17, 1930	James Edward Forrest	23	21	2	Male	Black	Oklahoma	Electrocution	
94	July 17, 1930	Tom Guest	48	45	3	Male	White	Oklahoma	Electrocution	
95	July 18, 1930	George Johnson Abshier	33	31	2	Male	White	Colorado	Hanging	
96	July 18, 1930	Howard Lester Royston	34	32	2	Male	White	Colorado	Hanging	
97	July 22, 1930	Victor Giampietro	24	22	2	Male	White	New Jersey	Electrocution	
98	July 22, 1930	Louis Malanga	23	21	2	Male	White	New Jersey	Electrocution	
99	July 22, 1930	John Murray	31	30	1	Male	White	New Jersey	Electrocution	
100	July 22, 1930	Joseph Rado	27	25	2	Male	White	New Jersey	Electrocution	
101	July 25, 1930	Bud Nolan	42	41	1	Male	Black	Arkansas	Electrocution	
102	July 25, 1930	Antonio Mangiaracina Jr.	30	28	2	Male	White	Missouri	Hanging	
103	July 25, 1930	John Messino	29	27	2	Male	White	Missouri	Hanging	
104	July 25, 1930	Carl Nasello	22	20	2	Male	White	Missouri	Hanging	
105	August 1, 1930	Thomas Laffette Lehew	35	34	1	Male	White	California	Hanging	
106	August 8, 1930	Rainey Williams	38	38	0	Male	Black	Texas	Electrocution	
107	August 12, 1930	Henry O. Lorenz	26	26	0	Male	White	Connecticut	Hanging	
108	August 15, 1930	William Henry Howell	62	60	2	Male	White	Arkansas	Electrocution	
109	August 15, 1930	John Gomez	22	21	1	Male	Hispanic	California	Hanging	
110	August 15, 1930	Robert Lee Wilkins	44	42	2	Male	White	Washington	Hanging	
111	August 20, 1930	Amelio Herrera	25	24	1	Male	Hispanic	Colorado	Hanging	
112	August 22, 1930	Theodore Ross	24	24	0	Male	Black	Delaware	Hanging	
113	August 22, 1930	Lee Davis	21	19	2	Male	Black	Texas	Electrocution	
114	August 28, 1930	Jesse Thomas	20	19	1	Male	White	New York	Electrocution	
115	August 28, 1930	William Force	28	27	1	Male	White	New York	Electrocution	
116	August 28, 1930	Claude Udwine	29	28	1	Male	White	New York	Electrocution	
117	August 29, 1930	Arthur Schaffer	29	27	2	Male	White	Washington	Hanging	
118	September 5, 1930	Carl Panzram	39	37	2	Male	White	Federal government	Hanging	
119	September 12, 1930	Jesse Lee Washington	21	21	0	Male	Black	Texas	Electrocution	
120	September 12, 1930	Archie Frank Moock	33	31	2	Male	White	Washington	Hanging	
121	September 19, 1930	Elwood Payne	33	33	0	Male	Black	Virginia	Electrocution	
122	September 22, 1930	Arthur Winder	27	26	1	Male	Black	Pennsylvania	Electrocution	
123	September 26, 1930	Berry Richardson	20	20	0	Male	Black	North Carolina	Electrocution	
124	September 26, 1930	Aaron Sharp	20	20	0	Male	Black	North Carolina	Electrocution	
125	October 2, 1930	Gordon Stewart Northcott	23	21	2	Male	White	California	Hanging	
126	October 3, 1930	Leonard Shadlow	Unknown	Unknown	1	Male	Black	Illinois	Electrocution	
127	October 3, 1930	Lafon Fisher	Unknown	Unknown	1	Male	Black	Illinois	Electrocution	
128	October 10, 1930	Harvey Lawrence	17	17	0	Male	Black	North Carolina	Electrocution	
129	October 17, 1930	Joyce Joseph "Bill Smith" Shepard	27	24	3	Male	White	Texas	Electrocution	
130	October 31, 1930	Alphonso Bellamy	18	18	0	Male	Black	Virginia	Electrocution	
131	November 7, 1930	Willie Massey	25	Unknown	Unknown	Male	Black	North Carolina	Electrocution	
132	November 7, 1930	Will Sloan	28	28	0	Male	Black	North Carolina	Electrocution	
133	November 7, 1930	Luz Gonzales Arcos	29	28	1	Male	Hispanic	Texas	Electrocution	
134	November 10, 1930	Charles Cramer	32	Unknown	Unknown	Male	White	Ohio	Electrocution	
135	November 10, 1930	Bert Walker	41	41	0	Male	White	Ohio	Electrocution	
136	November 14, 1930	Willie Joe Davis	Unknown	Unknown	1	Male	Black	Arkansas	Electrocution	
137	November 14, 1930	Eddie Long	30	29	1	Male	Black	Arkansas	Electrocution	
138	November 14, 1930	James Turnage	29	28	1	Male	Black	Arkansas	Electrocution	
139	November 14, 1930	George Washington	30	29	1	Male	Black	Arkansas	Electrocution	
140	November 14, 1930	Roosevelt Darnell	25	25	0	Male	White	West Virginia	Hanging	
141	November 17, 1930	Harry Coon	23	23	0	Male	White	Pennsylvania	Electrocution	
142	November 22, 1930	Wash Smith	19	17	2	Male	White	Georgia	Electrocution	
143	November 28, 1930	Leon Brown	Unknown	Unknown	1	Male	Black	Illinois	Electrocution	
144	November 28, 1930	Jess J. Maple	36	36	0	Male	White	Texas	Electrocution	
145	December 5, 1930	Alfred Edwin Boss	35	33	2	Male	White	California	Hanging	
146	December 5, 1930	George Davis	30	29	1	Male	White	California	Hanging	
147	December 5, 1930	George Ryley	21	20	1	Male	White	California	Hanging	
148	December 12, 1930	William Moya	30	29	1	Male	White	Colorado	Hanging	
149	December 12, 1930	William Lenhardt	35	33	2	Male	White	Illinois	Electrocution	
150	December 12, 1930	James Robert Butler	21	20	1	Male	White	New York	Electrocution	
151	December 12, 1930	Italo Ferdinandi	23	22	1	Male	White	New York	Electrocution	
152	December 12, 1930	James C. Bolger	19	18	1	Male	White	New York	Electrocution	
153	December 29, 1930	William Gimbel	21	20	1	Male	White	New Jersey	Electrocution	
154	December 29, 1930	Joseph Calabrese	22	Unknown	Unknown	Male	White	New Jersey	Electrocution	
155	December 29, 1930	Arthur Cort	23	Unknown	Unknown	Male	White	New Jersey	Electrocution	

== Demographics ==
Gender
Male	153	99%
Female	2	1%
Ethnicity
White	86	55%
Black	63	41%
Hispanic	5	3%
Native American	1	1%
State
California	15	10%
New York	15	10%
Arkansas	10	6%
New Jersey	10	6%
North Carolina	10	6%
Pennsylvania	9	6%
Texas	9	6%
Ohio	8	5%
Colorado	7	5%
Georgia	7	5%
Illinois	6	4%
Alabama	5	3%
Louisiana	5	3%
South Carolina	5	3%
Missouri	4	3%
Washington	4	3%
Virginia	3	2%
Arizona	2	1%
Connecticut	2	1%
Delaware	2	1%
Kentucky	2	1%
Oklahoma	2	1%
Tennessee	2	1%
West Virginia	2	1%
Wyoming	2	1%
District of Columbia	1	1%
Federal government	1	1%
Florida	1	1%
Indiana	1	1%
Maryland	1	1%
Mississippi	1	1%
Nevada	1	1%
Method
Electrocution	106	68%
Hanging	48	31%
Gas chamber	1	1%
Month
January	20	13%
February	12	8%
March	14	9%
April	6	4%
May	12	8%
June	21	14%
July	19	12%
August	13	8%
September	7	5%
October	6	4%
November	14	9%
December	11	7%
Age
Unknown	6	4%
10–19	7	5%
20–29	73	47%
30–39	45	29%
40–49	15	10%
50–59	6	4%
60–69	3	2%
Total	155	100%

== Executions in recent years ==
Number of executions
1931	155
1930	155
1929	102
Total	412

Preceded by 1929	List of people executed in the United States in 1930	Succeeded by 1931
