= Mirtel =

Mirtel may refer to:

- Mirtazapine, an antidepressant
- Héra Mirtel (1868–1931), French writer
- Mirtel Pohla (born 1982), Estonian actress
