= Fukunaga =

Fukunaga (福永) is a Japanese surname. Notable people with the surname include:

- Cary Fukunaga (born 1977), American film director, writer and cinematographer
- Gen Fukunaga (born 1962), American businessman
- Myles Fukunaga (1909–1929), American kidnapper
- Ryota Fukunaga (born 1998), Japanese para-athlete
- Satomi Fukunaga (福永 恵規, born 1967), Japanese idol, singer and actress
- Yasushi Fukunaga (福永 泰, born 1973), Japanese footballer
