= Fleagle =

Fleagle may refer to:

== People ==
- Brick Fleagle, an American jazz guitarist
- John G. Fleagle, an American anthropologist
- Patrick Fleagle, a US State Representative
- Fleagle Gang, the American bank robbers
