= Lynching of Raymond Byrd =

1926 lynching in Virginia, United States

- Location: Wythe County, Virginia, U.S.
- Date: August 15, 1926; 100 years ago
- Attack type: Lynching
- Deaths: 1
- Victim: Raymond Arthur Byrd

Raymond Arthur Byrd (April 2, 1895 – August 15, 1926) was an African-American farmhand who was lynched by a mob in Wythe County, Virginia on August 15, 1926.

== Early life ==
Byrd was born in Speedwell, Virginia, to Stephen and Josephine Sheffey Byrd. Byrd was the second of four children born in the family. He lived in the Black Lick district of Wythe County and was accused of rape and subsequently lynched by a mob on August 15, 1926. Byrd was kidnapped from the Wytheville jail by a mob of masked men, shot, bludgeoned, and dragged several miles before being hanged from a tree branch. Byrd's lynching became the subject of national news and prompted anti-lynching legislation to be signed into law by Governor Harry F. Byrd of Virginia in 1928. The only man indicted by a grand jury for the lynching, Floyd Willard, was acquitted by an all-white jury after only ten minutes of deliberation during the trial on July 19, 1927.

== Background ==
Raymond Byrd was a 31-year-old married man at the time of his death. He married Tennessee (Tennie) Hawkins in 1919 and the couple had three children, named Edith, Josephine, and Hazel. A veteran of World War I, he had served in 807th Pioneer Infantry in France. He was employed as a farmhand by Grover Grubb, a white property owner and father of three daughters. On July 23, 1926, one of Grubb's daughters, Minnie, gave birth in the back of a car en route to the local hospital, to a baby, named Clara (1926–1979), she had conceived with Byrd. Grover Grubb was enraged and demanded that the Commonwealth Attorney, H.M. Heuser, prosecute Byrd for rape. Heuser and a private lawyer hired by Grubb, Stuart B. Cambell, interviewed Minnie, Essie May, and the third daughter, named Nell, who was twelve years old at the time. The team of white lawyers determined that Minnie and Essie May consented to having sexual relations with Byrd several times in the past year, but since they were both legal adults, no charges could be brought up against Byrd on those grounds. He was accused of molesting the underage daughter named Nell. The prosecuting attorneys charged Byrd for this crime. Wythe County Sheriff W.C. Kincer arrested Byrd peacefully while the latter was attending a wake on August 7, 1926. Raymond Byrd was transported to the jail in Wytheville, Wythe County, where he was guarded by Claude Richardson.

== Lynching ==
In Virginia, a documented 86 men were lynched between 1888 and 1926. These murders typically did not result in conviction: nationally, only 0.8% of lynchings resulted in a conviction between 1900 and 1933. Virginia fared slightly better than the national average during the same time period, with 4% of lynchers convicted for their crimes. In 1926, the Virginia Law Register published an opinion by Chas. E. George that described lynching as "a necessity in order that…the virtue of the wives and daughters of every state [are] maintained." The Norfolk Virginian-Pilot opined "Lynching goes unpunished in Virginia because, deny it as one will, it commands a certain social sanction. An unwritten code is invoked to give the color of social necessity to a crime..." In fact, four lynchings had occurred in Wythe County between 1883 and 1926. Byrd's lynching was simply one of many such travesties of justice, but it would have profound legal and social repercussions.

In the early morning of August 15, 1926, around 12:45 a.m., the jailer Claude Richardson was confronted by between 25 and 50 masked men, most armed with firearms. Some of these men were dressed as women and all were in costume. Several members of the mob covered Richardson with repeating shotguns and demanded that he give up the keys to the cell doors. The Richmond Times-Dispatch, immediately after the lynching transpired, reported that nine bullets were fired into Byrd's head while he was asleep in the jail, but the coroner only found only one bullet wound – a .38 caliber slug that entered just above Byrd's heart and penetrated his left lung. After shooting Byrd, the mob beat him around the head with rifle butts, dragged him out of the cell and tied him to a car with a rope. They dragged Byrd to a wooded area near St. Paul's Lutheran Church on State Route 699 and hanged him from an oak tree less than half a mile from Grover Grubb's farm. Overall, the kidnapping and lynching, conducted in "deathly stillness", was said to be "perfectly planned and executed." While the phone line to the jail had been cut, Claude Richardson did not report the abduction until around 2:00 a.m. that night, despite being unrestrained and unharmed. After learning of the abduction, Sheriff Kincer only dispatched one deputy to find the lynch mob. This effort was unsuccessful and Byrd's body was found the next day by a local resident of Wythe County. Byrd's mutilated body was cut down from the tree at 10:00 a.m. by Sheriff Kincer on August 16, 1926.

== Trial ==
Byrd's lynching damaged the image that Governor Byrd had been trying to cultivate of Virginia as a progressive, orderly state suitable for outside investment. While residents of Wytheville "refused to become excited over the matter", the lynching spawned much condemnation of Wythe County in regional and national newspapers. James Weldon Johnson, NAACP executive secretary, declaimed: "Never in my experience have the editors of any state so outspokenly, unanimously and vigorously condemned a lynching outrage as have the Virginia editors the mob murder at Wytheville." Governor Byrd posted a $1,000 reward for information leading to the conviction of any members of the lynching party, and this was supplemented by a $100 reward sponsored by the Wythe County Board of Supervisors. A grand jury was summoned by Judge Horace Sutherland of the 21st Judicial Circuit, and was instructed to indict any witnesses they suspected of withholding the truth with the crime of perjury. The grand jury convened on September 1, 1926, and was composed solely of white men, led by the foreman, a Wytheville businessman named O. M. Johnson. The grand jury eventually indicted Floyd Willard, a Wythe County resident, for murder in January 1927. Willard had allegedly bragged about his participation in the lynching to hunting buddies some months prior to his indictment. The trial took place on July 19, 1927. Willard claimed he was innocent and had only been making an unfounded and drunken boast. After Willard's family provided alibis attesting that Willard had been asleep in bed during the night of the lynching and some of Willard's neighbors testified to his good character, the jury acquitted him of all charges after less than ten minutes of deliberation.

== Virginia anti-lynching legislation ==
Many prominent citizens were outraged at both the lynching and the failure to convict anyone of the crime. Louis I. Jaffé, editor of the Norfolk Virginian-Pilot, was a Pulitzer Prize-winning advocate of strong anti-lynching laws. In an August 29, 1926, editorial in the Pilot, he wrote that Governor Byrd should "make every lynching a matter of direct state concern and to arm the Governor as chief law enforcement officer, with the unrestricted power to initiate and prosecute investigations in to lynching's and to employ every power at his disposal to bring perpetrators to justice." After gathering legislative support and crafting an anti-lynching bill, Byrd addressed the General Assembly in the 1928 legislative session: "There is no excuse for lynching in a State where the enforcement of the law in cases likely to provoke mob violence has been prompt and rigorous. Attempted rape in Virginia may be punished by death, and juries are quick to punish crimes that once incited men to take the law in their own hands." Byrd signed the bill into law on March 14, 1928. The law stipulated that all members of a lynching mob could be prosecuted for murder, even if they had not physically done the deed themselves. Furthermore, the law allowed the Governor to provide funds for tracking down and prosecuting members of the mob.

== See also ==
- List of kidnappings (1900–1929)
