= Mei Zhanchun =

The Reverend Fr. Pascal Angelicus Melotto, OFM
- Missionary Priest
- Church: Roman Catholic Church

Orders
- Rank: Catholic Priest

Personal details
- Born: 1864 Lonigo, Italy
- Died: 1923 (aged 58–59) Hankou, China
- Buried: Mei Pavilion

Father Pascal Angelicus Melotto, OFM, popularly known as Father Mei Zhanchun was a Roman Catholic priest of the Franciscan Order. The Father Mei Memorial Catholic Hospital in Hankou, China was erected in his memory. He is one of the earliest Martyrs in China.

== Early life and priesthood ==
Father Mei was born in Lonigo, Italy in year 1864. He joined the Franciscan order in the year 1880.

== Persecution and death in China ==
Mei arrived in China in 1902 and adopted the Chinese name Father Mei Zhanchun.

He was kidnapped in 1923 and a large ransom was demanded. He was moved many times between Hubei and Henan provinces while in custody and died after three months because one of the kidnappers shot him in the stomach with a poisoned bullet. Shortly before dying, he said that, “I am happy to die for the Chinese. I lived in China for the Chinese and now I am happy to die for them.”

His remains were transferred to a memorial structure called the Mei Pavilion.

== Erection of memorial ==
After the involvement of the Italian government and Vatican, a hospital by the name Father Mei Memorial Catholic hospital was erected as his memorial in Hankou.

== Demolition of memorial ==
In 1952, all the missionaries were expelled from China and the hospital was renamed from Father Mei Memorial Catholic Hospital to Wuhan Jinyintan Hospital. In 2008, the hospital was destroyed and moved to another location.

== See also ==
- List of kidnappings (1900–1929)
- List of solved missing person cases (pre-1950)
