= List of people executed in the United States in 1928 =

One hundred and forty-five people, one hundred and forty-four male and one female, were executed in the United States in 1928, one hundred and eight by electrocution and thirty-seven by hanging.

Kentucky carried out a mass execution of seven people, which ties with a seven-fold execution in New York in 1912 for the largest mass execution by electrocution in U.S. history.

== List of people executed in the United States in 1928 ==
No.	Date of execution	Name	Age of person			Gender	Ethnicity	State	Method	Ref.
No.	Date of execution	Name	At execution	At offense	Age difference	Gender	Ethnicity	State	Method	Ref.
1	January 5, 1928	Charles J. Doran	23	22	1	Male	White	New York	Electrocution	
2	January 5, 1928	Louis Mason	24	23	1	Male	Black	New York	Electrocution	
3	January 6, 1928	Floyd Allen Hewitt	17	16	1	Male	White	Ohio	Electrocution	
4	January 9, 1928	John Coverson	18	17	1	Male	Black	Ohio	Electrocution	
5	January 9, 1928	Raymond Winter	32	29	3	Male	White	Pennsylvania	Electrocution	
6	January 9, 1928	William Meyers	Unknown	Unknown	1	Male	White	Pennsylvania	Electrocution	
7	January 12, 1928	May Ruth Snyder	32	31	1	Female	White	New York	Electrocution	
8	January 12, 1928	Henry Judd Gray	35	34	1	Male	White	New York	Electrocution	
9	January 13, 1928	Garfield Fuller	44	44	0	Male	Black	Georgia	Electrocution	
10	January 20, 1928	Albert Quinn	25	24	1	Male	Black	Georgia	Electrocution	
11	January 23, 1928	Leon Scovern	20	18	2	Male	White	Pennsylvania	Electrocution	
12	January 25, 1928	Ben H. Fowler	35	34	1	Male	White	Tennessee	Electrocution	
13	January 25, 1928	Shirley Winningham	25	25	0	Male	Black	Virginia	Electrocution	
14	January 27, 1928	Byron Dunn	Unknown	Unknown	3	Male	White	Louisiana	Hanging	
15	February 3, 1928	Wesley Homer Swain	42	42	0	Male	White	West Virginia	Hanging	
16	February 10, 1928	Aaron Ray	32	31	1	Male	Black	Louisiana	Hanging	
17	February 10, 1928	George Jefferson Hassell	39	38	1	Male	White	Texas	Electrocution	
18	February 10, 1928	Robert Lee Benton	24	23	1	Male	Black	Texas	Electrocution	
19	February 15, 1928	Manuel Lopez	41	40	1	Male	Hispanic	Washington	Hanging	
20	February 17, 1928	David Devlin	22	21	1	Male	Black	North Carolina	Electrocution	
21	February 20, 1928	Frank Arnold	47	45	2	Male	Black	Pennsylvania	Electrocution	
22	February 20, 1928	Frank Edward Lockett	33	31	2	Male	Black	Pennsylvania	Electrocution	
23	February 21, 1928	Robert Coates	36	36	0	Male	Black	Georgia	Electrocution	
24	February 24, 1928	Eugene Huggins	22	22	0	Male	Black	Mississippi	Hanging	
25	February 24, 1928	Marion Walton	24	24	0	Male	Black	Mississippi	Hanging	
26	February 28, 1928	Jerry Gedzium	21	18	3	Male	White	Massachusetts	Electrocution	
27	March 1, 1928	Philip Ecker	21	20	1	Male	White	New York	Electrocution	
28	March 9, 1928	John T. Burchfield	26	25	1	Male	White	Alabama	Electrocution	
29	March 9, 1928	Charlie Washington	30	28	2	Male	Black	Alabama	Electrocution	
30	March 9, 1928	Joseph Genna	23	22	1	Male	White	Louisiana	Hanging	
31	March 9, 1928	Molton Brasseaux	26	24	2	Male	White	Louisiana	Hanging	
32	March 13, 1928	Herbert J. Gleason	21	19	2	Male	White	Massachusetts	Electrocution	
33	March 15, 1928	Eddie Peppers	21	21	0	Male	Black	Ohio	Electrocution	
34	March 30, 1928	Willie Eutsey	21	20	1	Male	Black	Arkansas	Electrocution	
35	March 30, 1928	Will McKenzie	55	54	1	Male	Black	Arkansas	Electrocution	
36	March 30, 1928	Jasper Raymond Noakes	22	20	2	Male	White	Colorado	Hanging	
37	March 30, 1928	Arthur Alonzo Osborn	22	21	1	Male	White	Colorado	Hanging	
38	March 30, 1928	Andrew Jack Brady	33	Unknown	Unknown	Male	Black	West Virginia	Hanging	
39	April 6, 1928	Isiah Brooks	18	18	0	Male	Black	Alabama	Electrocution	
40	April 6, 1928	Frank D. Baldwin	22	18	4	Male	Black	New York	Electrocution	
41	April 10, 1928	John Grzyb	22	20	2	Male	White	Indiana	Electrocution	
42	April 12, 1928	Willie Ben Fisher	31	29	2	Male	Black	Texas	Electrocution	
43	April 18, 1928	Henry Ellis	25	24	1	Male	Black	Georgia	Electrocution	
44	April 19, 1928	Charles Itzak Birger	47	45	2	Male	White	Illinois	Hanging	
45	April 20, 1928	Matthew Seminary	31	30	1	Male	White	Louisiana	Hanging	
46	April 20, 1928	Ellsworth Kelley	32	29	3	Male	White	Oregon	Hanging	
47	April 20, 1928	James Willos	30	27	3	Male	White	Oregon	Hanging	
48	April 23, 1928	Rodger Loftus	Unknown	Unknown	2	Male	Black	Pennsylvania	Electrocution	
49	April 23, 1928	Marko Matakovich	35	34	1	Male	White	Pennsylvania	Electrocution	
50	April 27, 1928	Clarence O. Thomas	24	23	1	Male	Black	North Carolina	Electrocution	
51	May 4, 1928	Willard Clinton Shannon	27	25	2	Male	White	California	Hanging	
52	May 4, 1928	Edgar Price	24	22	2	Male	Black	Georgia	Electrocution	
53	May 11, 1928	Clarence Kelly	23	21	2	Male	White	California	Hanging	
54	May 18, 1928	James E. Grant	26	25	1	Male	Black	Georgia	Electrocution	
55	May 18, 1928	Burn Gray	36	Unknown	Unknown	Male	Black	Virginia	Electrocution	
56	May 25, 1928	John Clyburn	22	21	1	Male	Black	North Carolina	Electrocution	
57	May 29, 1928	Philip Jackson	30	29	1	Male	Black	District of Columbia	Electrocution	
58	May 31, 1928	John Fisher	Unknown	Unknown	Unknown	Male	Black	Mississippi	Hanging	
59	June 1, 1928	George Yarrow	28	27	1	Male	White	New Jersey	Electrocution	
60	June 1, 1928	Lawrence Davenport	22	21	1	Male	Black	Texas	Electrocution	
61	June 8, 1928	Charlie Hicks	21	20	1	Male	Black	Georgia	Electrocution	
62	June 13, 1928	Robert Carlton Pittman	26	24	2	Male	Black	Florida	Electrocution	
63	June 15, 1928	Robert Shelton	Unknown	Unknown	Unknown	Male	Black	Alabama	Electrocution	
64	June 15, 1928	Hines Loftin	Unknown	Unknown	Unknown	Male	Black	Mississippi	Hanging	
65	June 19, 1928	Will Terrell	22	21	1	Male	Black	Tennessee	Electrocution	
66	June 21, 1928	Wilmot Leroy Wagner	25	24	1	Male	White	New York	Electrocution	
67	June 22, 1928	By W. L. Sam	27	25	2	Male	Asian	Arizona	Hanging	
68	June 22, 1928	Shew Chin	23	21	2	Male	Asian	Arizona	Hanging	
69	June 22, 1928	Jew Har	30	28	2	Male	Asian	Arizona	Hanging	
70	June 22, 1928	Gee King Long	30	28	2	Male	Asian	Arizona	Hanging	
71	June 22, 1928	Nicholas Lee Eagles	31	30	1	Male	White	District of Columbia	Electrocution	
72	June 22, 1928	Samuel Moreno	21	19	2	Male	White	District of Columbia	Electrocution	
73	June 22, 1928	John Cline Proctor	19	17	2	Male	White	District of Columbia	Electrocution	
74	June 28, 1928	Robert Jones	22	21	1	Male	Black	Georgia	Electrocution	
75	June 29, 1928	Walter Wigger	31	29	2	Male	White	Oklahoma	Electrocution	
76	June 29, 1928	Theodore Bruster	21	20	1	Male	Black	Oklahoma	Electrocution	
77	June 29, 1928	Willie O'Neil	27	24	3	Male	Black	Oklahoma	Electrocution	
78	July 5, 1928	James Coleman	18	18	0	Male	Black	Ohio	Electrocution	
79	July 5, 1928	William Henry Wilson	19	19	0	Male	Black	Ohio	Electrocution	
80	July 6, 1928	Harold A. Hammond	36	35	1	Male	White	Georgia	Electrocution	
81	July 6, 1928	Medie Neely McCloud	29	28	1	Male	Black	Georgia	Electrocution	
82	July 10, 1928	Sinner Brown	Unknown	Unknown	1	Male	Black	Arkansas	Electrocution	
83	July 13, 1928	Sam B. Gower	45	45	0	Male	White	Georgia	Electrocution	
84	July 13, 1928	Preddis Taylor	33	32	1	Male	Black	Georgia	Electrocution	
85	July 13, 1928	Milford Lawson	35	33	2	Male	White	Kentucky	Electrocution	
86	July 13, 1928	Orlando Seymour	21	19	2	Male	White	Kentucky	Electrocution	
87	July 13, 1928	Hascue Dockery	22	20	2	Male	White	Kentucky	Electrocution	
88	July 13, 1928	Charles Paul Mitra	22	21	1	Male	White	Kentucky	Electrocution	
89	July 13, 1928	William Moore	45	43	2	Male	Black	Kentucky	Electrocution	
90	July 13, 1928	James Howard	22	43	2	Male	Black	Kentucky	Electrocution	
91	July 13, 1928	Clarence McQueen	38	36	2	Male	Black	Kentucky	Electrocution	
92	July 13, 1928	Greene Kirk	39	39	0	Male	Black	Mississippi	Hanging	
93	July 13, 1928	Will Burdo	Unknown	Unknown	1	Male	Black	Mississippi	Hanging	
94	July 17, 1928	Nathan Desatnick	24	23	1	Male	White	Massachusetts	Electrocution	
95	July 19, 1928	Joseph Lefkowitz	31	30	1	Male	White	New York	Electrocution	
96	July 20, 1928	Rodell Peoples	27	27	0	Male	Black	Alabama	Electrocution	
97	July 27, 1928	James Washington	19	Unknown	Unknown	Male	Black	Virginia	Electrocution	
98	July 30, 1928	Joseph Kameniski Jr.	20	20	0	Male	White	Pennsylvania	Electrocution	
99	August 2, 1928	Ludwig Halverson Lie	39	38	1	Male	White	New York	Electrocution	
100	August 3, 1928	Jim Hugh Moss	31	30	1	Male	Black	Georgia	Electrocution	
101	August 3, 1928	Clifford F. Thompson	23	22	1	Male	White	Georgia	Electrocution	
102	August 3, 1928	Charles P. Carey	28	27	1	Male	White	Maryland	Hanging	
103	August 3, 1928	Benjamin F. Spragins	28	27	1	Male	White	Maryland	Hanging	
104	August 3, 1928	Garrett Thomas	32	31	1	Male	Black	Texas	Electrocution	
105	August 9, 1928	George Appel	41	40	1	Male	White	New York	Electrocution	
106	August 9, 1928	Daniel J. Graham Jr.	26	25	1	Male	White	New York	Electrocution	
107	August 9, 1928	Alexander Kalinowski	50	49	1	Male	White	New York	Electrocution	
108	August 10, 1928	Emmett Lurly Bailey	38	37	1	Male	White	Washington	Hanging	
109	August 10, 1928	Lawrence Charles Fike	31	30	1	Male	White	West Virginia	Hanging	
110	August 17, 1928	Mark Dowell	24	23	1	Male	White	California	Hanging	
111	August 22, 1928	Henry Brown	37	37	0	Male	Black	Tennessee	Electrocution	
112	August 28, 1928	Will Vaughn	Unknown	Unknown	2	Male	Black	Florida	Electrocution	
113	August 30, 1928	Martin Luther Miller	32	32	0	Male	Black	New York	Electrocution	
114	August 31, 1928	Wallace Cloyce Gaines	47	45	2	Male	White	Washington	Hanging	
115	September 4, 1928	Melvin Johnson	26	25	1	Male	Black	Florida	Electrocution	
116	September 7, 1928	Clemente Rodriguez	22	21	1	Male	Hispanic	Texas	Electrocution	
117	September 7, 1928	Esquiel Servina	21	20	1	Male	Hispanic	Texas	Electrocution	
118	September 10, 1928	Pete Robinson	30	Unknown	Unknown	Male	Black	Arkansas	Electrocution	
119	September 18, 1928	Paul Crumpler	29	29	0	Male	Black	Florida	Electrocution	
120	September 25, 1928	James Turner	27	26	1	Male	Black	Florida	Electrocution	
121	September 28, 1928	Larry Newsome	22	21	1	Male	Black	North Carolina	Electrocution	
122	September 28, 1928	O.T. Alexander	40	39	1	Male	Black	Texas	Electrocution	
123	September 28, 1928	Tom Ross	35	34	1	Male	Black	Texas	Electrocution	
124	October 1, 1928	William R. Phillips	34	34	0	Male	White	Pennsylvania	Electrocution	
125	October 1, 1928	Jesse G. Parker	21	21	0	Male	White	Pennsylvania	Electrocution	
126	October 9, 1928	George Davis	25	Unknown	Unknown	Male	Black	Florida	Electrocution	
127	October 10, 1928	Charles Shader	21	19	2	Male	White	Illinois	Hanging	
128	October 19, 1928	William Edward Hickman	20	19	1	Male	White	California	Hanging	
129	October 19, 1928	John Burke	23	Unknown	Unknown	Male	Black	Mississippi	Hanging	
130	October 19, 1928	Frank Ewing Sharp	51	49	2	Male	White	Nebraska	Electrocution	
131	October 23, 1928	Herbert Harvey	21	20	1	Male	Black	Florida	Electrocution	
132	October 30, 1928	Roosevelt Kirkland	25	24	1	Male	Black	Florida	Electrocution	
133	November 16, 1928	Hopkins Watkins	27	Unknown	Unknown	Male	Black	Maryland	Hanging	
134	November 26, 1928	Charles Lovell	46	46	0	Male	White	Pennsylvania	Electrocution	
135	November 30, 1928	Charles J. "Stanley" Hoppe	26	26	0	Male	White	Ohio	Electrocution	
136	November 30, 1928	John Rucker	46	45	1	Male	Black	Ohio	Electrocution	
137	December 3, 1928	Rogers Dilsworth	Unknown	Unknown	3	Male	Black	Pennsylvania	Electrocution	
138	December 7, 1928	John Joseph Malone	30	29	1	Male	White	California	Hanging	
139	December 14, 1928	Robert Percy Lofton	35	32	3	Male	White	Mississippi	Hanging	
140	December 14, 1928	Thomas Moran	22	20	2	Male	White	New York	Electrocution	
141	December 15, 1928	Dominick Bressette	33	33	0	Male	Native American	Illinois	Electrocution	
142	December 15, 1928	John Brown	32	32	0	Male	Black	Illinois	Electrocution	
143	December 15, 1928	Claude Clarke	48	48	0	Male	Black	Illinois	Electrocution	
144	December 19, 1928	Richard Henry Sheppard	56	55	1	Male	Native American	Georgia	Electrocution	
145	December 31, 1928	Wray Wormsley	24	23	1	Male	Black	Pennsylvania	Electrocution	

== Demographics ==
Gender
Male	144	99%
Female	1	1%
Ethnicity
Black	73	50%
White	63	43%
Asian	4	3%
Hispanic	3	2%
Native American	2	1%
State
Georgia	15	10%
New York	14	10%
Pennsylvania	13	9%
Texas	9	6%
Florida	8	6%
Mississippi	8	6%
Kentucky	7	5%
Ohio	7	5%
Alabama	5	3%
California	5	3%
Illinois	5	3%
Louisiana	5	3%
Arizona	4	3%
Arkansas	4	3%
District of Columbia	4	3%
North Carolina	4	3%
Maryland	3	2%
Massachusetts	3	2%
Oklahoma	3	2%
Tennessee	3	2%
Virginia	3	2%
Washington	3	2%
West Virginia	3	2%
Colorado	2	1%
Oregon	2	1%
Indiana	1	1%
Nebraska	1	1%
New Jersey	1	1%
Method
Electrocution	108	74%
Hanging	37	26%
Month
January	14	10%
February	12	8%
March	12	8%
April	12	8%
May	8	6%
June	19	13%
July	21	14%
August	16	11%
September	9	6%
October	9	6%
November	4	3%
December	9	6%
Age
Unknown	10	7%
10–19	7	5%
20–29	70	48%
30–39	41	28%
40–49	13	9%
50–59	4	3%
Total	145	100%

== Executions in recent years ==
Number of executions
1929	102
1928	145
1927	139
Total	386

Preceded by 1927	List of people executed in the United States in 1928	Succeeded by 1929
