= List of people executed in the United States in 1929 =

One hundred and two people, one hundred and one male and one female, were executed in the United States in 1929, sixty-nine by electrocution and thirty-three by hanging.

== List of people executed in the United States in 1929 ==
No.	Date of execution	Name	Age of person			Gender	Ethnicity	State	Method	Ref.
No.	Date of execution	Name	At execution	At offense	Age difference	Gender	Ethnicity	State	Method	Ref.
1	January 4, 1929	John Brown	22	Unknown	Unknown	Male	Black	South Carolina	Electrocution	
2	January 4, 1929	George Palmer	21	Unknown	Unknown	Male	Black	South Carolina	Electrocution	
3	January 11, 1929	John Bradshaw	56	55	1	Male	Black	Ohio	Electrocution	
4	January 11, 1929	Floyd Newton Byrnes	25	24	1	Male	White	Texas	Electrocution	
5	January 14, 1929	Tony Lucitti	38	37	1	Male	White	Pennsylvania	Electrocution	
6	January 14, 1929	Benjamin Danarowicz	32	31	1	Male	White	Pennsylvania	Electrocution	
7	January 14, 1929	Charles F. Mellor	22	21	1	Male	White	Pennsylvania	Electrocution	
8	January 18, 1929	Marshall Redding	35	33	2	Male	Black	Georgia	Electrocution	
9	January 18, 1929	Willie Clarence George	23	21	2	Male	Black	Georgia	Electrocution	
10	January 18, 1929	Ed Capers	19	17	2	Male	Black	Georgia	Electrocution	
11	January 18, 1929	Willie Gilham	21	19	2	Male	Black	Georgia	Electrocution	
12	January 21, 1929	Paul Jaworski	29	25	4	Male	White	Pennsylvania	Electrocution	
13	January 21, 1929	Calvin Dridge James	26	25	1	Male	White	Pennsylvania	Electrocution	
14	January 24, 1929	Isadore Helfant	21	25	1	Male	White	New York	Electrocution	
15	January 24, 1929	Harry Dreitzer	23	22	1	Male	White	New York	Electrocution	
16	January 24, 1929	Israel Fisher	18	17	1	Male	White	New York	Electrocution	
17	January 25, 1929	George Kuryla	41	41	0	Male	White	California	Hanging	
18	February 1, 1929	Ada Regina LeBoeuf	40	38	2	Female	White	Louisiana	Hanging	
19	February 1, 1929	Thomas Eldon Dreher	56	54	2	Male	White	Louisiana	Hanging	
20	February 1, 1929	Thomas E. Lowry	24	21	3	Male	White	Missouri	Hanging	
21	February 1, 1929	Leonard Ray Yeager	31	29	2	Male	White	Missouri	Hanging	
22	February 8, 1929	Harrison Harvey Randolph	24	24	0	Male	White	California	Hanging	
23	February 8, 1929	Henry Grogan	20	Unknown	Unknown	Male	Black	West Virginia	Hanging	
24	February 15, 1929	Edgar Lapierre	31	29	2	Male	White	California	Hanging	
25	February 15, 1929	Everett Koon	28	28	0	Male	White	Ohio	Electrocution	
26	February 20, 1929	Anthony Grecco	18	17	1	Male	White	Illinois	Electrocution	
27	February 20, 1929	Charles Walz	18	17	1	Male	White	Illinois	Electrocution	
28	February 22, 1929	George Griffin Grinstead	48	48	0	Male	White	Georgia	Electrocution	
29	March 1, 1929	Elijah Bartley Wall	54	53	1	Male	White	Louisiana	Hanging	
30	March 2, 1929	Vicente Kacel	32	31	1	Male	Asian	Hawaii Territory	Hanging	
31	March 4, 1929	James Parker	24	22	2	Male	Black	Pennsylvania	Electrocution	
32	March 4, 1929	Raymond Parker	21	19	2	Male	Black	Pennsylvania	Electrocution	
33	March 4, 1929	John H. Wilson	20	18	2	Male	Black	Pennsylvania	Electrocution	
34	March 6, 1929	George Elmer Harrison Taylor	47	45	2	Male	White	Massachusetts	Electrocution	
35	March 15, 1929	Dock Jiles	30	Unknown	Unknown	Male	Black	Alabama	Electrocution	
36	March 20, 1929	John Clark	44	43	1	Male	Black	Georgia	Electrocution	
37	March 22, 1929	Perry Allen Coen	29	27	2	Male	White	California	Hanging	
38	March 22, 1929	Samuel Thomas	30	Unknown	Unknown	Male	Black	California	Hanging	
39	March 25, 1929	Elverez Miquel	28	26	2	Male	Hispanic	Pennsylvania	Electrocution	
40	March 29, 1929	Henry Jones	20	Unknown	Unknown	Male	Black	Virginia	Electrocution	
41	March 29, 1929	Luther R. Baker	61	59	2	Male	White	Washington	Hanging	
42	April 5, 1929	Leong Fook	54	53	1	Male	Asian	California	Hanging	
43	April 12, 1929	Wade Wilborn	47	Unknown	Unknown	Male	Black	Texas	Electrocution	
44	April 19, 1929	Charlie Robinson	23	22	1	Male	Black	South Carolina	Electrocution	
45	April 19, 1929	Robert Fulsom Blake	24	20	4	Male	White	Texas	Electrocution	
46	April 26, 1929	Leo McCurrie	28	Unknown	Unknown	Male	Black	North Carolina	Electrocution	
47	April 27, 1929	Silas Richardson	30	29	1	Male	Black	Mississippi	Hanging	
48	April 27, 1929	Mathis Sanders	26	26	0	Male	Black	Texas	Electrocution	
49	May 14, 1929	Frederick Hinman Knowlton Jr.	36	35	1	Male	White	Massachusetts	Electrocution	
50	May 17, 1929	James Crumady	25	24	1	Male	Black	Georgia	Electrocution	
51	May 17, 1929	Henry Moten	27	Unknown	Unknown	Male	Black	Virginia	Electrocution	
52	May 24, 1929	Silas Jarman	18	17	1	Male	Black	Texas	Electrocution	
53	May 31, 1929	Henry James Sherman	21	20	1	Male	White	Nebraska	Electrocution	
54	May 31, 1929	David Ware	49	48	1	Male	Black	New Jersey	Electrocution	
55	June 14, 1929	Theodore D. Carr	55	54	1	Male	White	West Virginia	Hanging	
56	June 20, 1929	Morgan Swan	23	22	1	Male	Black	Illinois	Electrocution	
57	June 20, 1929	Napoleon Glover	19	18	1	Male	Black	Illinois	Electrocution	
58	June 20, 1929	Oliver Cannon Wells	41	39	2	Male	White	Texas	Electrocution	
59	June 24, 1929	Angelo Lazzarini	40	39	1	Male	White	Pennsylvania	Electrocution	
60	June 28, 1929	Freddie Willey	18	17	0	Male	Black	North Carolina	Electrocution	
61	July 1, 1929	James T. Nevins	42	41	1	Male	White	Ohio	Electrocution	
62	July 19, 1929	Rodney Ford	28	27	1	Male	White	Ohio	Electrocution	
63	July 22, 1929	Jeff Dozier	60	59	1	Male	Black	Georgia	Electrocution	
64	July 25, 1929	Willie Grady	20	19	1	Male	Black	Texas	Electrocution	
65	July 26, 1929	Will Carter	27	26	1	Male	Black	Alabama	Electrocution	
66	July 26, 1929	Jimmy Johnson	25	25	0	Male	Black	Louisiana	Hanging	
67	August 2, 1929	Russell St. Clair Beitzel	28	27	1	Male	White	California	Hanging	
68	August 2, 1929	Harry John Leahy	45	42	3	Male	White	Texas	Electrocution	
69	August 9, 1929	John Orestes Marsh	51	51	0	Male	White	Maryland	Hanging	
70	August 17, 1929	James Horace Alderman	45	43	2	Male	White	Federal government	Hanging	
71	August 23, 1929	Charles Harris	38	38	0	Male	Black	Alabama	Electrocution	
72	August 29, 1929	John Fabri	31	30	1	Male	White	New York	Electrocution	
73	August 30, 1929	Jack H. Price	42	41	1	Male	White	California	Hanging	
74	September 5, 1929	James Henry Helms	32	30	2	Male	White	Texas	Electrocution	
75	September 6, 1929	Samuel Robert Haskins	32	32	0	Male	Black	Virginia	Electrocution	
76	September 7, 1929	Constantine Beaver	32	31	1	Male	Native American	Federal government	Hanging	
77	September 11, 1929	Malcolm S. Morrow	31	30	1	Male	White	Georgia	Electrocution	
78	September 11, 1929	Homer Caswell Simpson	42	41	1	Male	White	Georgia	Electrocution	
79	September 12, 1929	Willis Buckner	32	32	0	Male	White	North Carolina	Electrocution	
80	September 13, 1929	Carl E. Hord	21	19	2	Male	White	Kentucky	Electrocution	
81	September 13, 1929	Ivan Thomas Hutsell	25	23	2	Male	White	Kentucky	Electrocution	
82	September 13, 1929	Willard F. Morrison	24	24	0	Male	White	West Virginia	Hanging	
83	September 13, 1929	Walter E. Wilmot	20	20	0	Male	White	West Virginia	Hanging	
84	September 27, 1929	Paul Rowland	36	35	1	Male	White	California	Hanging	
85	September 30, 1929	William Weston Jr.	32	35	1	Male	Black	Pennsylvania	Electrocution	
86	October 4, 1929	Willie Bryant	23	23	0	Male	Black	Georgia	Electrocution	
87	October 4, 1929	Alvin Thomas Merritt	25	25	0	Male	White	Georgia	Electrocution	
88	October 4, 1929	Edward McKay	22	22	0	Male	Black	Louisiana	Hanging	
89	October 4, 1929	William Virgets	26	26	0	Male	Black	Louisiana	Hanging	
90	November 1, 1929	Arthur J. Maul	24	24	0	Male	White	Ohio	Electrocution	
91	November 6, 1929	Rollin Davisson	42	42	0	Male	White	Montana	Hanging	
92	November 19, 1929	Myles Yukata Fukunaga	20	19	1	Male	Asian	Hawaii Territory	Hanging	
93	November 22, 1929	Ernest Fox	19	15	4	Male	Black	North Carolina	Electrocution	
94	November 29, 1929	Lee Roy Merriman	28	27	1	Male	White	Texas	Electrocution	
95	November 29, 1929	Luther Clayborn	35	Unknown	Unknown	Male	Black	Virginia	Electrocution	
96	December 3, 1929	Charles Trippi	23	22	1	Male	White	Massachusetts	Electrocution	
97	December 10, 1929	John W. Feltovic	21	21	0	Male	White	Connecticut	Hanging	
98	December 13, 1929	George Costello	27	26	1	Male	White	California	Hanging	
99	December 13, 1929	Antone Negra	50	49	1	Male	White	California	Hanging	
100	December 19, 1929	Bennie Aldridge	26	25	1	Male	White	Texas	Electrocution	
101	December 20, 1929	Mario Croce	40	39	1	Male	White	California	Hanging	
102	December 20, 1929	Peter Kudzinowski	26	25	1	Male	White	New Jersey	Electrocution	

== Demographics ==
Gender
Male	101	99%
Female	1	1%
Ethnicity
White	58	57%
Black	39	38%
Asian	3	3%
Hispanic	1	1%
Native American	1	1%
State
California	12	12%
Georgia	12	12%
Pennsylvania	11	11%
Texas	11	11%
Louisiana	6	6%
Ohio	5	5%
Illinois	4	4%
New York	4	4%
North Carolina	4	4%
Virginia	4	4%
West Virginia	4	4%
Alabama	3	3%
Massachusetts	3	3%
South Carolina	3	3%
Federal government	2	2%
Hawaii Territory	2	2%
Kentucky	2	2%
Missouri	2	2%
New Jersey	2	2%
Connecticut	1	1%
Maryland	1	1%
Mississippi	1	1%
Montana	1	1%
Nebraska	1	1%
Washington	1	1%
Method
Electrocution	69	68%
Hanging	33	32%
Month
January	17	17%
February	11	11%
March	13	13%
April	7	7%
May	6	6%
June	6	6%
July	6	6%
August	7	7%
September	12	12%
October	4	4%
November	6	6%
December	7	7%
Age
10–19	8	8%
20–29	49	48%
30–39	20	20%
40–49	16	16%
50–59	7	7%
60–69	2	2%
Total	102	100%

== Executions in recent years ==
Number of executions
1930	155
1929	102
1928	145
Total	402

Preceded by 1928	List of people executed in the United States in 1929	Succeeded by 1930
