= Webb Miller (journalist) =

American journalist and war correspondent (1891–1940)

- Born: Cub Webster Miller; February 10, 1891; Pokagon Township, Michigan, U.S.
- Died: May 7, 1940 (aged 49); London, England
- Resting place: Dewey Cemetery, Dowagiac, Michigan, U.S.
- Occupations: Journalist, war correspondent
- Spouse: Marie
- Children: 1

Webb Miller (born Cub Webster Miller; February 10, 1891 – May 7, 1940) was an American journalist and war correspondent. He covered the Pancho Villa Expedition, World War I, the Spanish Civil War, the Italian invasion of Ethiopia, the Phoney War, and the Russo-Finnish War of 1939. He was nominated for the Pulitzer Prize for his coverage of the execution of the French serial killer Henri Désiré Landru ("Bluebeard") in 1922. His reporting of the Salt Satyagraha raid on the Dharasana Salt Works was credited for helping turn world opinion against British colonial rule of India.

== Early life ==
Webb Miller was born Cub Webster Miller in Pokagon, Michigan in 1891. His father, Jacob Miller, was a tenant farmer. He attended elementary school in Pokagon and other regional schools. He attended high school in Dowagiac, where he was a track and field runner and football player as well as a reporter for the school paper. Early in life, he became a lifelong vegetarian.

While growing up, Miller was a friend of Ring Lardner, who also became a prominent writer. He also began reading the book Walden by Henry David Thoreau, and carried a copy of the work with him for the rest of his life.

After graduation from high school, he attempted to find work as a reporter at the South Bend Tribune in South Bend, Indiana, but the paper would not hire him. He worked as a captain on a passenger steamboat (he was fired after wrecking the ship) and as a schoolteacher in Walnut Grove, Minnesota. He visited a brothel, and wrote extensively about his experience there. In 1912, he went to Chicago, Illinois, and began work as a "legman"—reporting on the scene by telephone to journalists in the office who would rewrite his work and get the byline. He primarily covered murders, executions and court cases. During this time, he shortened his name to "Webb Miller" because it made for a better byline.

Miller was kidnapped in 1914. Helen Morton, daughter of Morton Salt co-founder Mark Morton, had eloped and married against her father's wishes. Morton tracked his daughter down and challenged the marriage on the grounds that Helen Morton was mentally deranged. A court ruled in his favor, and Helen was committed to an asylum. Miller attempted to interview Helen Morton, but Mark Morton had his employees beat Miller unconscious. Morton then kidnapped Miller and drove off—with the 23-year-old journalist tied up in the trunk of his car. Morton crashed the automobile, and police discovered the bound Miller in the vehicle. Miller sued Morton for $50,000, but won only a minimal payment of $500 six years later.

== Journalism career ==
In 1916, Miller went to work as a freelance journalist. He followed Gen. John J. Pershing into Mexico as part of the Punitive Expedition pursuing Pancho Villa. Having spent most of his life walking (not driving) from town to town in Michigan, Miller was one of the few journalists able to keep up with Pershing's expedition as it marched through the Mexican desert. Miller's reporting led to a job with the United Press later that year.

=== World War I ===
In 1917, UP sent Miller to London to cover World War I. He observed the war-time air raids against the city, and his reports of the terrifying bombardments brought him worldwide notice. UP named him London Bureau Chief as a reward for his success. Covering both the British and American fronts in Europe, Miller was present at and reported on the Battle of Château-Thierry, the Second Battle of the Aisne, and the Meuse-Argonne Offensive.

Miller was the first American journalist to report that an armistice had been reached with Germany. After the armistice, Miller covered the Paris Peace Conference and interviewed Raymond Poincaré, Georges Clemenceau, David Lloyd George and Woodrow Wilson as well as covering the peace talks. While reporting from Versailles, Miller met and became acquainted with an Italian journalist, Benito Mussolini. He later parlayed this relationship into an interview in 1932.

=== Inter-war period ===
In late 1918, Miller was assigned to cover the aftermath of the Easter Rising in Ireland. He interviewed Sinn Féin founder Arthur Griffith and political activist Michael Fitzgerald, both then in hiding.

In 1920, he covered the Rif War in Morocco. During this time, he met and became friends with the former Spanish dictator, Miguel Primo de Rivera.

In 1921, Miller was named Paris Bureau Chief for UP, and was promoted in 1925 to European Bureau Chief.

In 1922, while traveling in France, Miller saw Henri Désiré Landru (known as "Bluebeard") guillotined in a Versailles street for murdering 10 women and a boy. Miller began timing the execution. The executioners threw Landru onto the upper platform of the guillotine which such force that the deck partially collapsed. The executioners clamped him to the deck, and executed him. Miller's report, which won worldwide acclaim for on-the-spot reporting, noted that the entire botched execution took only 26 seconds. His report, with its graphic description of Landru's death, led to a nomination for the Pulitzer Prize.

Miller was nominated again for a Pulitzer Prize in 1927, this time in reporting for an Armistice Day report on the state of World War I battlefields in France.

In 1930, Miller took a 12,000-mile airplane trip across the Middle East and India. While in India, he met and became friends with Mohandas Gandhi. Gandhi was launching the Salt Satyagraha, and Miller stayed to cover the event. Miller witnessed the raid on the Dharasana Salt Works on May 21, 1930, in which more than 1,300 unarmed Indians were severely beaten and several deaths occurred. Miller's report helped turn world opinion against the British occupation of India. Gandhi himself later said that Miller "helped make" Indian independence through his eyewitness report.

His Middle East experiences later landed Miller a job reporting on the Italian invasion of Ethiopia in 1935. Once more, he walked alongside an army traveling in the desert, telling his audience how his shoes and socks turned to bloody rags as he marched through the sand and rocks. Miller reported on the "surprising efficiency" in which the Italians—armed with bombers, tanks, field artillery, gasoline and napalm—massacred thousands of natives armed only with spears, slings and the occasional handgun. His reports, conveyed by courier across the desert to the nearest telegraph and then to the world, often reached Rome before the official Italian military reports did. Miller's articles were the only news reports to come from the front line during the opening of the war. He was nominated for a Pulitzer Prize a third time, in this instance for a 44-minute report delivered by telephone at the start of the war.

Exhausted from his constant travels and depressed after seeing so much bloodshed, Miller flew to the United States on the inaugural trans-Atlantic flight of the Hindenburg. From May to September, he worked on his memoirs. His book, I Found No Peace, was published by Simon & Schuster in November 1936.

Miller immediately went back out into the field. His success in Ethiopia led UP to assign him to cover the initial stages of the Spanish Civil War in late 1936. In 1937 and 1938, he traveled to the Soviet Union, where he covered the Stalinist purges and smuggled his reports out of the country.

== World War II ==
Miller reported widely on many of the key early events leading up to World War II. He attended the Munich Conference, and interviewed Adolf Hitler, Neville Chamberlain and Mussolini. He traveled to Czechoslovakia immediately afterward, and reported from the scheduled advance of German troops into the Sudetenland. He remained in the country for the next six months, and again reported from the front lines on March 12, 1939, when German troops occupied the rest of Czechoslovakia.

As tensions rose between Germany and France, Miller returned to Paris. During the Phoney War, Miller rushed to the Low Countries and filed numerous reports. Miller immediately went to Finland after the Soviet Union invaded on November 30, 1939. He spent Christmas Eve in four inches of newly-fallen snow with Finnish soldiers on the front lines of the "Winter War."

== Death in the tunnel ==
Miller died on the evening of May 7, 1940, in London, while traveling on the London Underground. There were no eyewitnesses to his death. However, British investigators later concluded that the train had come to a stop in the tunnel rather than at a platform. Miller, they said, stepped out of the train and fell on the tracks. He hit his head against the tunnel wall and died. While the press proclaimed his death "mysterious" and friends said the experienced traveler would never have made such an error, the case was closed and his death ruled accidental.

Webb Miller was survived by his wife, Marie, and a son, Kenneth. He was buried in Dewey Cemetery in Dowagiac.

== Cultural influences ==
In 1943, the U.S. government announced that Liberty ships would begin to be named after distinguished journalists who had died in action. The first Liberty ship to be named for a war correspondent was the SS Webb Miller. The ship carried American soldiers onto the beaches at Normandy.

Scholars now consider Miller's account of Bluebeard's death a classic of spot journalism. The report is often required reading for aspiring journalists.

Webb Miller was also the inspiration for the character of Vince Walker in the movie Gandhi, portrayed by Martin Sheen.

== Cigarette case ==
When he met Mohandas Gandhi in 1930, Miller was carrying a cigarette case. Gandhi agreed to inscribe his name on the case on the condition that it never be used again to carry cigarettes. Miller agreed. Miller carried the cigarette case with him for the rest of his life. Most of the dignitaries and world leaders he met over the next 10 years inscribed their names on the case, including Benito Mussolini, Franklin D. Roosevelt, David Lloyd George, Adolf Hitler, and author Vicente Blasco Ibáñez.

The cigarette case was stolen after his death, and never reappeared. Most of his journals, papers, and personal effects now reside at the Museum of Southwestern Michigan College.

== See also ==
- List of kidnappings (1900–1929)
