= Myles Fukunaga =

Executed Hawaiian murderer

- Born: February 4, 1909; Kaumakani, Territory of Hawaii
- Died: November 19, 1929 (aged 20); O'ahu Prison, O'ahu, Territory of Hawaii
- Occupation: Hotel worker
- Status: Executed by hanging
- Motive: Financial gain
- Convictions: First degree murder (October, 1928)
- Penalty: Death

Details
- Victims: George Gill Jamieson, 10
- Date: September 18, 1928

Myles Yukata Fukunaga (February 4, 1909 – November 19, 1929) was a Japanese-American from Honolulu, Hawaii. On September 18, 1928, he kidnapped and murdered George Gill Jamieson, the 10-year-old son of a local banker. He was inspired to commit by the crime by the Leopold and Loeb and Marion Parker cases.

Subsequent to the murder, he demanded a $10,000 ransom. Before the body of the victim was found, the Hawaiian Trust Company offered a reward of $5,000 with no questions asked. Fukunaga eventually received $4,000 in $5 bills from the victim's father before he was arrested. He was convicted of first degree murder, sentenced to death, and executed.

== See also ==
- Capital punishment in Hawaii
- List of people executed in the United States in 1929
