= Murder of Marion Parker =

1927 child murder in Los Angeles

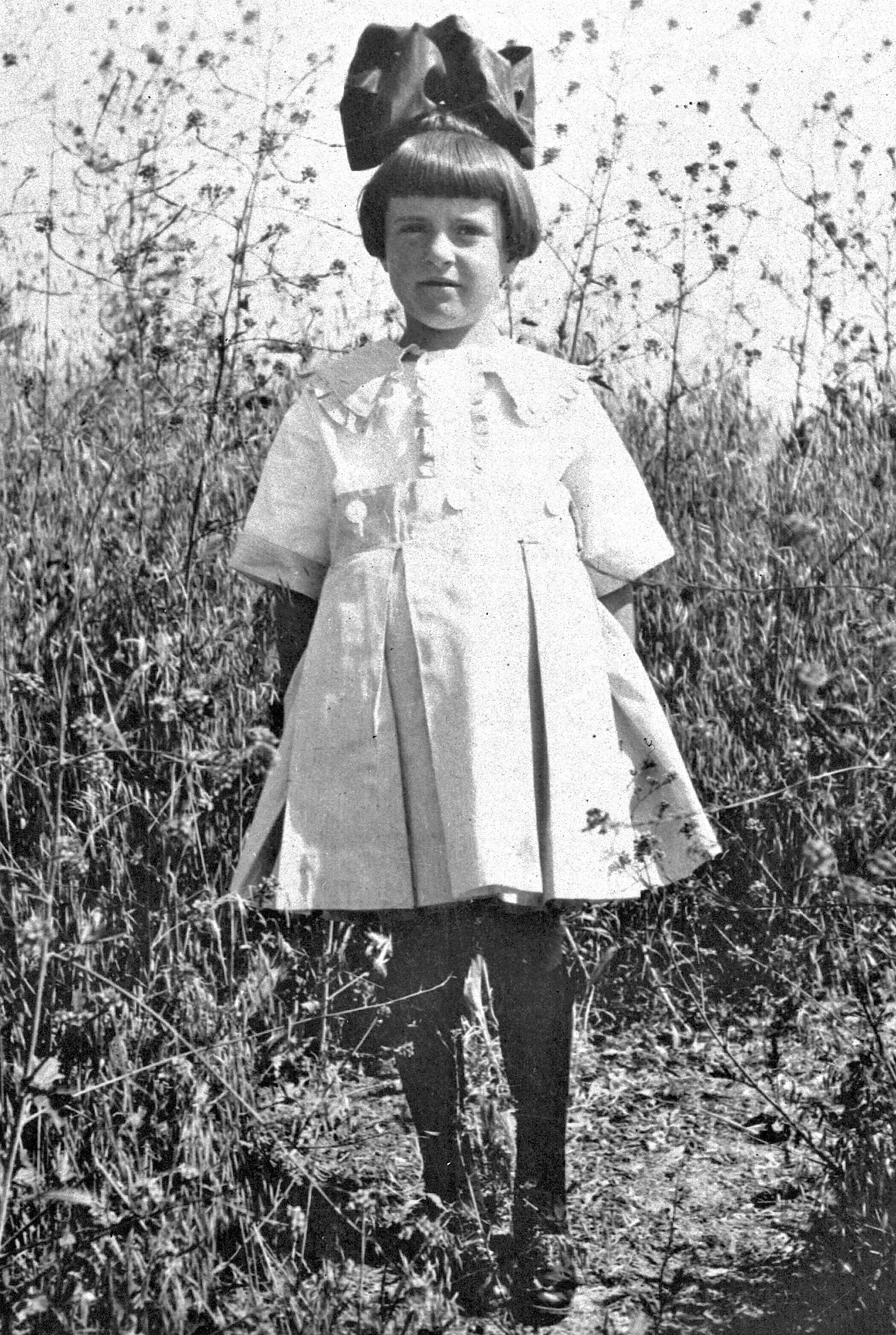
- Family portrait of Marion Parker, c. 1924
- Location: 34.066060°N 118.251670°W; Los Angeles, California, U.S.
- Date: December 15, 1927 (abduction); December 17, 1927; 98 years ago (murder)
- Attack type: Child murder by strangulation, child abduction, mutilation
- Victims: Frances Marion Parker, aged 12
- Perpetrator: William Edward Hickman
- Motive: Ransom, possibly revenge against Parker's father
- Verdict: Guilty on both counts
- Convictions: First-degree murder, kidnapping
- Sentence: Death

Frances Marion Parker (October 11, 1915 – December 17, 1927) was an American child who was abducted and murdered in Los Angeles, California, in 1927. Her murder was deemed by the Los Angeles Times as "the most horrible crime of the 1920s", and at the time was considered the most horrific crime in the history of California. In later decades, Parker's death was the subject of various murder ballads.

Parker went missing on December 15, 1927, after she was dismissed from her classes at Mount Vernon Junior High School in Lafayette Square: an unknown man, posing as an employee of her father, Perry, checked her out of school with the registrar, stating that her father had suffered an accident. The next day, the Parker family received ransom letters demanding $1,500 (equivalent to $28,125 in 2025) in gold. The letters were signed with various titles, including "Fate", "Death", and "The Fox"; and some had words written in Greek.

Following the orders of the ransom, Perry Parker—a bank employee—met his daughter's abductor in central Los Angeles on December 17, 1927. Upon the exchange of the money, the assailant drove away, throwing Marion's mutilated body out of his car as he fled. The child had been significantly disfigured, her limbs cut off, her eyes fixed open with wires, and her abdomen disemboweled and stuffed with rags; her limbs were discovered the next day in Elysian Park.

Parker's murderer was soon identified as William Edward Hickman (born February 1, 1908), a 19-year-old former co-worker of Perry. Law enforcement officers tracked Hickman throughout the Pacific Northwest over several days, relying on sightings in Albany and Portland, Oregon, and Seattle, Washington, where he paid shop-owners with gold certificates given to him in the ransom. He was arrested in Echo, Oregon, on December 22, 1927, and then extradited to California, where he was convicted of Parker's murder. He made a written confession, in which he explained in detail how he strangled Parker, disarticulated her limbs, and disemboweled her.

Hickman and his defense claimed that he was insane and that a deity, "Providence", told him to commit the crime. He was one of the first defendants in California to use what was then a new law, which allowed defendants to plead that they were not guilty by reason of insanity. Hickman was convicted and sentenced to death. After an unsuccessful appeal, he was executed by hanging at San Quentin State Prison in October 1928. Marion Parker was survived by her parents; elder brother; and twin sister, Marjorie.

== Background ==
Marion Parker, c. 1922

Frances Marion Parker was born October 11, 1915, in Los Angeles, California, to Geraldine (née Heisel) and Perry Marion Parker. She had a twin sister, Marjorie, and one older brother, Perry Jr.

== Abduction ==
Parker went missing from Mount Vernon Junior High School, located in the Lafayette Square section of Los Angeles, on December 15, 1927. She was excused from class by the registrar, Mary Holt, after a man, presenting himself as an employee of the bank where Perry Parker worked, claimed that Perry had suffered an automobile accident and wished to see his daughter. The man, apparently unaware of Marion's twin sister, Marjorie, was given possession of Marion. Holt later claimed that she "never would have let Marion go but for the apparent sincerity and disarming manner of the man." Parker was reported missing later that day.

== Investigation ==
=== Ransom demands ===
The next day, December 16, the first of several ransom letters were delivered via telegram to the Parker home, demanding $1,500 (equivalent to $28,125 in 2025) in $20 gold certificates. All communications by the kidnapper were signed with names such as "Fate," "Death," and "The Fox." The first telegram, addressed from Pasadena, read, "Do positively nothing till you receive special delivery letter," with what appeared to be Marion's signature on it. A second telegram, sent shortly after from Alhambra, read, "Marion secure. Use good judgment. Interference with my plans dangerous." This telegram was signed with the name George Fox.

In another of the successive telegrams, it was indicated that "no one will ever see the girl again except the angels in heaven." This letter, signed "Fate," also had the word "Θάνατος," Greek for "death," written at the top. Through the telegram correspondence, a meeting location was established in the late hours of December 16 for Perry to exchange the ransom. Prior to departing, he recorded the serial numbers of each of the bills so they could be identified when used in future exchanges, allowing authorities to track the kidnapper. This first attempt by Perry to deliver the ransom failed when the kidnapper realized that police had followed Perry and were monitoring the anticipated exchange. The kidnapper failed to appear while Perry waited at the location for several hours.

Throughout the next day, December 17, the Parker home received numerous further telegrams from the kidnapper, the first of which scolded Perry over the national press attention that Marion's kidnapping had received, as well as for allowing police to spy upon their planned exchange. In the telegram, the kidnapper indicated that December 17 was the "last day" before he would kill Marion. An attached letter, written in Marion's handwriting, pleaded to her father to follow the ransom demands without police involvement. After consulting with authorities, Perry was given permission to meet with the kidnapper alone and without police monitoring, out of fear for his daughter's life.

Two further telegrams were sent to the Parker house on the afternoon of December 17. The first, signed "Fox–Fate," began, "P.M. Parker: Please recover your senses. I want your money rather than to kill your child. But so far you have given me no other alternative." The following telegram, signed simply "Fate," read, "Fox is my name. Very sly you know. Set no traps. I'll watch for them. Get this straight! Remember that life hangs by a thread. I have a Gillette ready and am able to handle the situation."

=== Exchange and murder discovery ===
On the evening of December 17, Perry received several phone calls at his home from the kidnapper, which established a new meeting for delivering the ransom money, with the agreed location being the corner of West 5th Street and South Manhattan Place in central Los Angeles. At 7:15 p.m., the kidnapper phoned the home, instructing Perry to depart immediately to the aforementioned location, assuring him that he would recognize Perry's car.

Perry arrived at the location alone with the ransom money at approximately 8 p.m., and was confronted by the kidnapper only moments after arriving. The suspect, driving a Chrysler coupe, pulled up next to Perry's vehicle and held him at gunpoint with a sawed-off shotgun; the unknown man had a bandana covering most of his face. During the exchange, Perry was able to see Marion seated in the passenger seat of the car, concealed up to her neck by clothing, but not visibly moving. When he called out to her, she did not respond, though her eyes were visibly open; Perry assumed she had been drugged. As soon as the money was handed over, the assailant put his vehicle into gear, moving forward, and pushed Marion's body out of the car before speeding away. Some reports state the assailant commented, "There's your daughter," before throwing the body onto the street.

Realizing his daughter was deceased, Perry phoned authorities. After Marion's body was recovered from the street, an autopsy was completed on the remains at approximately 9 p.m. The coroner indicated that the child had been dead for approximately twelve hours. Marion's arms and legs had been cut off, and she had been disemboweled, her lower torso stuffed with a towel and a man's shirt. Her eyes had been held open with piano wires, to give the appearance that she was still alive.

The following morning, December 18, a man on a morning walk in Elysian Park found the severed arms and legs of a child, each wrapped in newspaper, lying in disarray on a street. Upon recovering the limbs, police positively identified them as belonging to Marion.

=== Manhunt ===
A massive manhunt for Marion's killer began on December 17, 1927, involving over 20,000 police officers and American Legion volunteers. A reward of $50,000 was offered for the identification and capture of the killer, dead or alive. This was later raised to $100,000 (equivalent to $1,875,000 in 2025) after numerous contributions from the public. On December 20 the getaway car, in which Marion's killer had departed, was found abandoned and identified as having been stolen in San Diego. Fingerprints were able to be taken from the door of the car.

Several suspects were considered at this time, including Earl Smith, the son of a local dentist; and Lewis H. Wyatt, who was apprehended and interviewed in Las Vegas, Nevada. They were cleared of suspicion after Mary Holt, the registrar who had spoken with Marion's abductor, confirmed neither one was the same man.

=== Suspect identification ===
Police traced a laundry mark on the towel found stuffed inside Marion's torso to the Bellevue Arms apartments (34.066060°N 118.251670°W), where they interviewed a number of tenants. On December 20, the fingerprints taken from the getaway car were identified as belonging to William Edward Hickman (born February 1, 1908), a former coworker of Perry Parker. Both men were employed by the First National Bank of Los Angeles, where Parker worked as an assistant cashier and Hickman as an officer.

The year prior, Hickman had been arrested on a complaint made by Perry regarding stolen and forged checks totaling $400. He was convicted and sentenced to probation, after which he spent six months living with family in Kansas City, Missouri, before returning to Los Angeles. Additional fingerprints lifted from the ransom letters were positively identified as Hickman's. It was subsequently discovered that Hickman had been a new resident of the Bellevue Arms, having moved into the building recently under the alias "Donald Evans."

Upon examination of Hickman's apartment, bloody footprints were discovered, evidence of a crime. Additionally, police found partly burnt handwritten drafts of ransom letters, as well as newspaper clippings about the kidnapping. Residents of the Bellevue Arms told police that during their initial combing of the building, Hickman had not been home and hence had not been encountered by law enforcement. Additionally, a janitor in the building reported that he had witnessed Hickman carrying several packages to his car on the night of December 16, and observed him wiping down the seats of the car the following day.

== Search for William Hickman ==
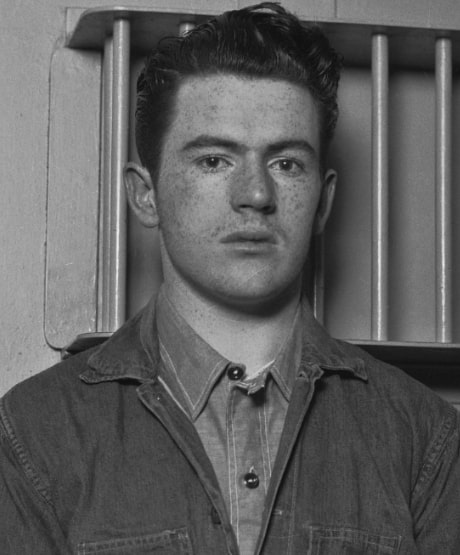
Hickman

=== Oregon and Washington sightings ===
Identifying Hickman as the prime suspect in Parker's murder, law enforcement traced his path north as he fled to Oregon. He was sighted by a gas station attendant in Albany, Oregon, on the morning of December 20, 1927, driving a green Hudson vehicle later determined to have been stolen in Los Angeles. At the Albany gas station, Hickman purchased 10 US gallons (38 L) of gasoline. According to the attendant, Hickman was dressed in a dark blue suit and wore Oxford shoes. The attendant reported the sighting to police the next day after reading a newspaper article indicating that Hickman was most likely driving a green Hudson. Police were subsequently able to trace him to Seattle, Washington, where he used two of the $20 gold certificates given to him as part of Perry's ransom to purchase clothes from a haberdashery on the evening of December 21.

Around 6:30 a.m. on December 22, Fred King, a gas station proprietor in Portland, spotted Hickman at his service station, where he was again purchasing gasoline. King immediately reported the sighting to police, indicating that Hickman had driven away from the service station east, in the direction of the Columbia River Gorge. A bulletin was posted following King's report, and officers were stationed on all roads leading east of Portland. Hickman later admitted that, before departing Portland, he disposed of his California license plates, replacing them with two Washington license plates he had stolen from a car in Olympia the day before.

=== Arrest and confession ===
At approximately 1:30 p.m. on December 22, Chief of Police Tom Gurdane and traffic officer Buck Lieuallen arrested Hickman in Echo, Oregon, after a frantic 2-mile (3.2 km) car chase. The officers had recognized him from wanted posters. In the green Hudson, the officers discovered $1,400 of the gold ransom given to him from Perry. At the time of his arrest, Hickman proclaimed: "Some fiend killed her. I don't know who he is," before stating: "I did it because I wanted the money to pay my way through college."

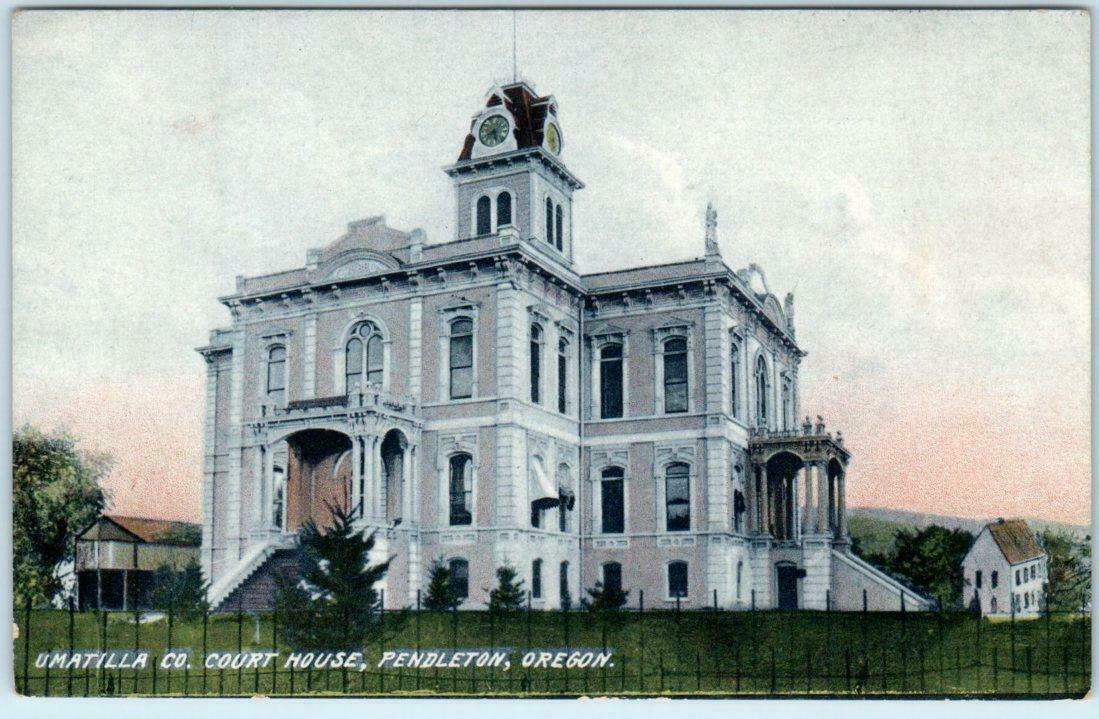
The Umatilla County Courthouse and Jail, where Hickman made his first confession

While detained at the Umatilla County jail in Pendleton, Oregon, Hickman confessed to helping participate in Parker's kidnapping, but implicated two men—brothers Oliver and Frank Cramer—as accomplices who carried out the murder. Hickman relayed an extensive story to a journalist from the East Oregonian, in which he claimed to have participated in a kidnapping plot with the Cramers. Hickman claimed to have spent time with Parker, even having taken her to see Figures Don't Lie at the Rialto Theatre. He took responsibility for the telegrams and phone calls, but claimed that it was the Cramers who had actually carried out the murder.

Police, however, determined this to be impossible, as the Cramer brothers had been incarcerated for several months on other charges. It was subsequently determined that Hickman knew the brothers through one of their girlfriends, with whom he was acquainted; aware that both of the men had criminal histories, police surmised Hickman attempted to implicate them on this basis, but the authorities assured the public they were "satisfied" that neither of the Cramer men, nor their girlfriends, were aware of or involved in Parker's abduction or murder. Additionally, Hickman at first denied having committed the murder in his apartment in the Bellevue Arms, despite the discovery of blood evidence there. Captain Bright of the Pendleton Police Department commented: "Hickman said the Parker girl was not killed in the Bellevue Arms apartment house. We know that she was killed there. If his statement is wrong in that, it is discredited in other details."

Hickman was extradited to Los Angeles, where he confessed to the murder of Clarence Ivy Toms, which he had committed during a drugstore hold-up with the help of 15-year-old Welby Hunt; he also confessed to having committed a number of other armed robberies. In subsequent correspondence, authorities were able to coax further details about Parker's murder, which Hickman disclosed via written confession after realizing his claims regarding the Cramer brothers had been disproven. Hickman admitted that he blindfolded and tied Parker to a chair in his apartment at the Bellevue Arms and then strangled her until she was unconscious. He proceeded to hang Parker's body upside down in his bathtub, slicing her throat at the jugular vein to drain the body of blood. After disarticulating her arms and legs, he proceeded to disembowel her, during which he stated the body jerked with such force that it "flew out of the tub," suggesting that she might still have been alive during the dismemberment.

Hickman subsequently wrapped Parker's limbs in newspaper before temporarily storing her torso in a suitcase. He then left the apartment to see a film at the Loew's State Theater, but claimed he was unable to focus on the feature and wept throughout. Later that night, realizing that Parker's father might want to physically see his daughter before paying the ransom, Hickman attempted to reconstruct and disguise Marion's body to make it appear that she was alive, leading him to adorn her with makeup and sew her eyes open with wire. Reflecting on the entire ordeal, Hickman told police: "She felt perfectly safe and the tragedy was so sudden and unexpected that I'm sure she never actually suffered through the whole affair, except for a little sobbing which she couldn't keep back for her father and mother."

== Legal proceedings ==
=== Trial ===
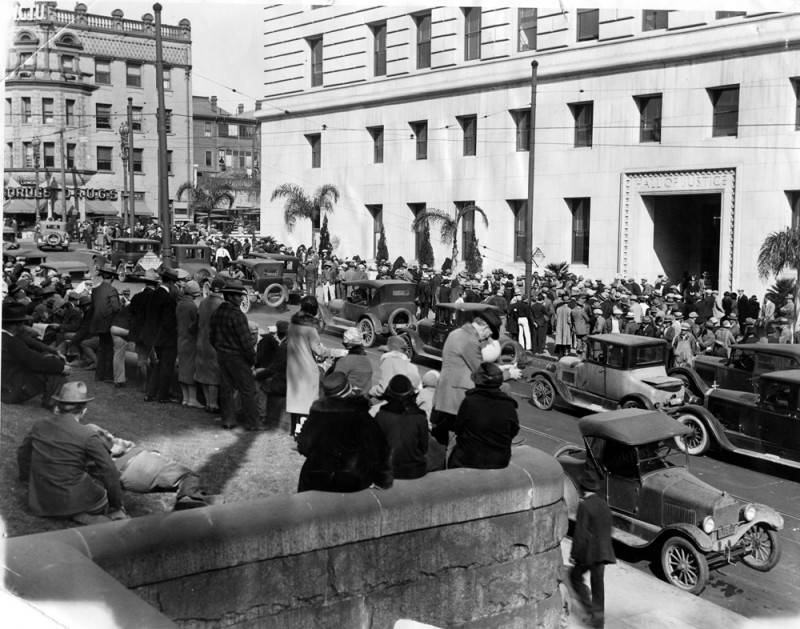
Crowd gathered on the street in front of the Hall of Justice during the trial

Hickman told his attorneys that he had killed Parker upon the direction of a supernatural deity he called "Providence". This claim was touted by Hickman's defense attorney in court, who attempted to explain Hickman's actions by reason of insanity. The defense professed that Hickman was mentally ill and deeply influenced by his religious grandfather, who had exposed him to "frenzied religious exorcisms... Out of the limbo of his subconscious mind, surcharged with severe repressions of his awful childhood, homicide and mutilation ideated."

Hickman was one of the first defendants to use California's new law that allowed pleas of not guilty by reason of insanity (despite having initially told police that he needed the $1,500 ransom to attend Park College, a Bible college in Kansas City). Evidence contradicting his insanity defense included testimony from prison guards at the Umatilla County jail in Oregon, who state that Hickman had asked them how he could "act crazy" during his incarceration. Dr. W. D. McCary, a Pendleton psychologist who examined Hickman in jail, observed that "his mind seemed clear," and he "told a straight, coherent story and was never at a loss for words. There was nothing about him to indicate insanity... He says that he does not like girls, that he is deeply religious, and that his ambition was to become a minister. Several times he made mention of God."

Prosecutors speculated that Hickman wanted revenge against Parker's father for having testified against him in his earlier trial for theft and forgery. There is evidence that Hickman committed the murder, in part, for the notoriety it would bring him, as he divulged to one reporter that he wanted as much press coverage as was received by the high-profile killers Leopold and Loeb.

Los Angeles County District Attorney Asa Keyes delivered the prosecution's closing argument.

=== Conviction and execution ===
In February 1928, a jury rejected the insanity defense and the judge sentenced Hickman to death by hanging. He appealed his conviction but it was upheld by the California Supreme Court. During his final months, Hickman reportedly embraced Roman Catholicism and wrote letters of apology to his victims' families.

In March 1928, Hickman and Welby Hunt were found guilty of first degree murder in the death of Clarence Ivy Toms. The two both received life terms after the jurors recommended mercy for each of them. Hunt was released on parole in March 1939.

On October 19, 1928, Hickman was hanged on the gallows in San Quentin Prison. Upon falling through the trap doors of the gallows, he struck his head and hanged, "violently twitching and jerking." Per witnesses, it took approximately two minutes for Hickman to die. An autopsy performed after his execution showed that Hickman's neck did not break during the hanging, and that he had died from asphyxia.

== Media representations ==
=== Ayn Rand's The Little Street ===
In 1928, the writer Ayn Rand began planning a novel called The Little Street, whose protagonist, Danny Renahan, was to be based on her impressions of Hickman. The novel was never finished, but Rand wrote notes for it which were published after her death in the book Journals of Ayn Rand. In these notes she writes that the public fascination with Hickman was not due to the heinousness of his crimes, but to his defiant attitude and his refusal to accept conventional morals. She describes him as "a brilliant, unusual, exceptional boy" and speculates about the society that turned him into "a purposeless monster". Rand wanted the protagonist of her novel to be, "A Hickman with a purpose. And without the degeneracy. It is more exact to say that the model is not Hickman, but what Hickman suggested to me." Rand scholars David Harriman, Chris Matthew Sciabarra and Jennifer Burns all interpret Rand's interest in Hickman as a sign of her early admiration toward the ideas of Friedrich Nietzsche, especially since she several times referred to Danny as a "Superman" (in the Nietzschean sense).

=== Songs ===
In the years following the crime, Parker's murder was subject to various folk murder ballads, many of which alternately spelled her name "Marian." One of the earliest recorded ballads inspired by the Parker murder, "Little Marian Parker", was recorded by Vernon Dalhart and Carson Robison, and released in 1928 by Columbia Records. The same year, Andrew Jenkins (under the pseudonym Blind Andy) released the ballad "Little Marion Parker" as a single on Okeh Records, with the b-side "The Fate of Edward Hickman." Another ballad inspired by the crime, "The Marion Parker Murder", was recorded and released in 1939, performed by John McGhee.

The Reverend J. M. Gates also composed a Negro spiritual inspired by the Parker case, titled "California Kidnapping," in which he compared her abduction and murder to his family's past as slaves.

=== Other media ===
The Parker case was one of those that the LAPD provided to NBC for transcription into episodes of the Dragnet police procedural drama. The episode based on the case, entitled "Sullivan Kidnapping – The Wolf", was the 15th episode in the Dragnet radio series and was originally broadcast on September 10, 1949. It too uses the fact that Hickman was tracked down by tracking ransom money, but changes the story so that the arrest happens at the theater.

The 2020 revival of Perry Mason featured a premise based loosely on the murder of Marion Parker.

== See also ==
- Capital punishment in California
- Capital punishment in the United States
- List of kidnappings
- List of murdered American children
- List of people executed in the United States in 1928

== Sources ==
- Burns, Jennifer (2009). Goddess of the Market: Ayn Rand and the American Right. New York: Oxford University Press. ISBN 978-0-19-532487-7.
- Neibaur, James L. (2016). Butterfly in the Rain: The 1927 Abduction and Murder of Marion Parker. New York City, New York: Rowman & Littlefield. ISBN 978-1-442-25119-9.
- Rand, Ayn (1997). Harriman, David (ed.). Journals of Ayn Rand. New York: Dutton. ISBN 0-525-94370-6.
- Sciabarra, Chris Matthew (1998). "A Renaissance in Rand Scholarship". Reason Papers. 23.
- Zaballos, Nausica (2011). Crimes et Procès Sensationnels à Los Angeles. Au-delà du Dahlia Noir. Paris: E-Dite. ISBN 978-2846083102.
