= Fleagle Gang =

The Fleagle Gang was a group of early 20th century American bank robbers and murderers. They were executed or killed after robbing the First National Bank in Lamar, Colorado. Their cases were the first in which the Federal Bureau of Investigation (FBI) used a single fingerprint as part of the evidence leading to a conviction. They were also suspected to have committed a series of previous bank robberies over a 10-year period.

== Planning ==
On May 23, 1928, Ralph Fleagle, his brother Jake Fleagle, George J. Abshier, (a.k.a. Bill Messick), and Howard "Heavy" Royston, came in to Lamar, Colorado. They planned to rob the First National Bank.

They met at a ranch near Marienthal, Kansas shortly before the robbery, but Jake Fleagle had planned on robbing the Lamar bank for some time. Like many professional robbers of that time, the Fleagles, together with Abshier, had carefully scouted the bank on several occasions before they decided to commit the crime

The gang had maps of the roads of Prowers County, Colorado, and the brothers had been inside the bank building and knew its layout. Abshier said they had weighed the "possibilities" and decided that it was a job for no less than four men, so they recruited Heavy Royston.

When they left Kansas on May 23, about 3 a.m., the men had license plates from Kansas, Colorado, Oklahoma, and California to throw any witnesses off their track. Each man was heavily armed.

The drive took about six hours, but the plan required them to wait until the afternoon to commit the robbery. At about 1 p.m., they went into action.

== The robbery ==
E. A. Lundgren, a one-armed teller at the bank, was waiting on a customer when he saw the men come into the bank and heard one shout, "You sons-a-bitches get them all up!" and another yell, "Hands up!"

In the noise and confusion of the moment, Bank President A. N. Parrish ducked into his office and pulled out a Colt 45 he called "Old Betsy" and fired at the closest bank robber from the door to his office, hitting Royston in the jaw, and then, by all, accounts, all hell broke loose.

The bank teller, William Garrett and Miss Vivian Potter, another bank employee, later said two of the gunmen struggled with customers and most of the gang members were shouting to their victims to either lie down or put their hands up. Abshier, who later confessed to his role in the robbery and its aftermath, recalled:

I grabs hold of the man standing alongside of me, shoved him to the floor; told him to get down. I wanted them out of the way of the bullets.

During the struggle, Parrish, the bank president, who had shot Royston in the face, was subsequently shot and killed. Jaddo Parrish, the son of the president, a bank employee, was also killed in the fusillade.

The bandits loaded their booty — $10,664 in cash, $12,400 in Liberty bonds, and almost $200,000 in commercial paper — into pillowcases and grabbed two hostages. The original plan had called for the gang to take Jaddo Parrish as hostage, because they felt that his father would not pursue them and risk his son's life, but, when Jaddo was killed, the gunmen took other hostages.

== Escape ==
The gang, along with hostages Eskel A. Lundgren and a teller named Everett Kesinger, headed out to the car by a back door and drove out of town. After fending off the sheriff in a car chase that ended at a crossing on Sand Creek northeast of Lamar, where the robbers used rifles to disable the sheriff's car, the gang got away. Ralph Fleagle was driving the 1927 blue Buick Master Six getaway car.

During the car chase the gang released the one-armed teller Lundgren. Kesinger pleaded that he had a wife and new baby, and asked to be let go, but the bandits refused, forcing Kesinger to ride on the floor of the back seat of the car while Royston in the front seat used a pillowcase to catch the blood from his wound.

The gang arrived back in Kansas by nightfall. Royston, who had been shot by the bank president, needed medical attention, so the gang tricked a local doctor into coming out from his Dighton, Kansas home at night by telling him that a young boy's foot had been crushed by a tractor.

When Dr. W. W. Wineinger arrived at the ranch, he discovered the ruse, but treated Royston's wounds. After he finished, the gang bound him up and blindfolded him, took him out of the ranch, shot him in the back of the head with a shotgun, and rolled his body and his Buick into a ravine north of Scott City, Kansas. The car and doctor's body were spotted from the air by a Colorado National Guard airplane that had been brought from Denver to aid in the search. Dozens of citizen posses crisscrossed the counties along the Colorado border in search of the getaway car.

The Fleagle brothers took Kesinger to a shack near Liberal, Kansas and shot him. The body was discovered about three weeks after the bank robbery.

== Manhunt ==
The gang divided the loot and separated, with Abshier driving Royston to Minneapolis, Minnesota to be seen by a dental surgeon. After reaching Minneapolis each man went to a different area of the country with Abshier going to Grand Junction, Colorado, Royston to San Andreas, California, and Ralph to San Francisco, California. It took police about 13-months to track down the owner of the single latent fingerprint left on the windows of Dr. Wineinger's car. Jake Fleagle was arrested by Detective Paul Quyle after Quyle found a cache of weapons in a house he had rented him in Stockton, California in March 1929. His fingerprints were sent to the Bureau of Investigation (later known as the Federal Bureau of Investigation) in Washington, D.C., where they were identified as Jake Fleagle's and connected to the Lamar bank robbery. The Stockton Police had released Jake after fingerprinting. Ralph Fleagle was arrested first in Kankakee, Illinois, and after flying back to Kansas and being booked in Lamar he was taken to Colorado Springs, where he eventually confessed. Ralph agreed to provide authorities with information about the rest of the gang in exchange for the release of his two brothers Fred and Walt Fleagle. A nationwide manhunt for Jake resulted in his death in a shootout on a train in Branson, Missouri, in October 1930 after his brother had been hanged in Colorado. Royston was captured at his home in San Andreas, California, and Abshier was arrested in Grand Junction, Colorado.

== Legal process ==
The three were tried first in Lamar, Colorado, and in a sensational series of trials in October and November 1929, and they were all sentenced to hang.

Their appeals to the Colorado Supreme Court did not succeed, and the men were executed over a two-week period in mid-July 1930. This was the very first time the FBI used a single fingerprint to convict someone of a crime, and was a major success for the Bureau.

== Treasure ==
Even today, treasure hunters scour the west looking for the caches of loot supposedly buried by skinflint Ralph Fleagle. Credible rumors, but little proof, abound about unrecovered loot buried in California, Kansas and possibly Missouri. There is evidence that Ralph invested much of his money, and possibly owned an apartment building in San Francisco, where he had been living before being arrested in Kankakee, Illinois. Ralph's wife Margaret was sent away by the Fleagle family shortly after Ralph was hanged in Colorado, but there is no evidence of where she went.

== Sources ==
- Abshier v. People, No. 12,558., Supreme Court of Colorado, 87 Colo. 507; 289 P. 1081; 1930 Colo. LEXIS 258, June 9, 1930
- Royston v. People, No. 12,559., Supreme Court of Colorado, 87 Colo. 529; 289 P. 1077; 1930 Colo. LEXIS 259, June 9, 1930
- Fleagle v. People, No. 12,580., Supreme Court of Colorado, 87 Colo. 532; 289 P. 1078; 1930 Colo. LEXIS 260, June 9, 1930
- The Fleagle Gang, by N.T. Betz ISBN 978-1-4208-1761-4 (2005 Authorhouse)
