= Héra Mirtel =

French writer, woman of letters, feminist, salonnier, lecturer and suffragist

Marie-Louise Victorine Bessarabo
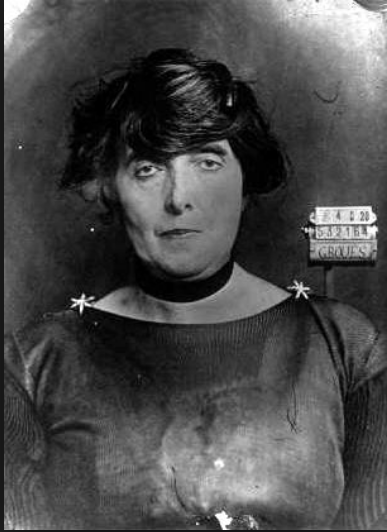
- Mugshot (1920)
- Born: Marie-Louise Victorine Grouès; 24 October 1868; Lyon, France
- Died: 21 March 1931 (aged 62); Rennes, France
- Resting place: Saint-Paul-sur-Ubaye, Alpes de Haute-Provence, France
- Occupations: writer, woman of letters, militant feminist, salonnier, lecturer
- Spouse(s): Pierre Paul Antoine Jacques (m. 1897; suicide 1914), Ishmael Jacob Providence Weissmann (m. 1915; murder 1920)
- Writing career
- Pen name: Héra Mirtel, Juliette de Boulogne, Juliette de Lotus
- Language: French

Marie-Louise Victorine Bessarabo (pen names, Héra Mirtel, Juliette de Boulogne, Juliette de Lotus; 24 October 1868 - 21 March 1931) was a French writer, woman of letters, militant feminist, salonnier, lecturer, and ardent suffragist. She was also a spiritist and a "believer in the Black Mass," a stock exchange gambler, a plotter for the restoration of the royalist regime in France, as well as an advisor of other women in matrimony and affairs of the heart. Mirtel was famous for the murder of her second husband, Georges Bessarabo, whose body was sent in a "bloody trunk" "from Paris to Nancy, by rail. Defended by Vincent de Moro-Giafferi, she was sentenced to twenty years' imprisonment. She was suspected of having murdered her first husband as well.

== Early years ==
Marie-Louise Victorine Grouès was born in Lyon on 24 October 1868. She was the aunt of Abbé Pierre.

== Career ==
Known by her pen name, Héra Mirtel, she wrote novels, poems, plays, and many articles, including columns for Le Sillon de Bordeaux, magazine exclusively written by women; Le Soleil, daily; La Renaissance Contemporaine, literary review; and Le Divan. She was the founder of the newspaper L'Entente, and secretary general of the editorial staff of La Renaissance contemporaine. In addition, Mirtel worked in advertising, and lectured at Université Populaire de Montmartre. Mirtel advocated a matriarchal feminism inspired by the theses of Johann Jakob Bachofen.

In 1897, in Saltillo, Mexico, she married Pierre Paul Antoine Jacques, a trader of the Ubaye valley. After becoming financially enriched in Mexico, she became a widow in March 1914, with two daughters, Paule (1898) and Louise (1900). In 1915, in Mexico, she married Ishmael Jacob Providence Weissmann, a commissioner born in Romania, who called himself Georges Bessarabo.

Mirtel murdered Bessarabo in Square La Bruyère, Paris, on 31 July 1920. On 4 August 1920 his corpse, shot dead by a revolver, was discovered at the bottom of a trunk in the Nancy rail station, having been sent by train from the Gare de l'Est. On 21 June 1922 Mirtel, defended by Vincent de Moro-Giafferi, was sentenced to twenty years of forced labor. During the investigation, suspicions weighed on the death of her first husband, who feared that his wife would poison him, and who committed suicide with a revolver in March 1914. But the investigation confirmed the suicide. His daughter, Paule, present at the scene of the crime and judged for complicity, was acquitted. Many dailies followed the trial, rich in theatrics: Le Petit Parisien (17 issues), Le Temps (12 January 1922), Le Matin (22 June 1922), Le Figaro (29 April 1921), Le petit journal illustré (18 June 1922), L'Ouest-Éclair (June 9, 1922) and Le Gaulois (29 April 1921). Arthur Bernède recounted the lawsuit in the Bessarabo case (Tallandier, 1931).

In 1929, after recognizing that Paule had lied, there was a request for the revision of the trial. Mirtel, incarcerated in Rennes and on the verge of obtaining a conditional release, died on 21 March 1931. She was buried with her first husband, in Saint-Paul-sur-Ubaye, in the Alpes de Haute-Provence.

== The Gruesome Case of Mme. Bessarabo ==
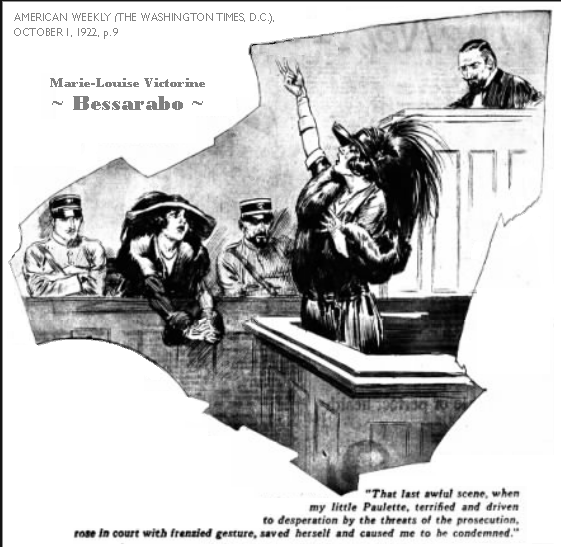
The trial of Mme. Bessarabo

In The Police Journal (1920), L. Czapski provided a narrative of the case:—

"I am not a woman who kills. Everything in my past life protests against such an accusation. All my works radiate with proof that I am a creatress. Being that, I cannot destroy." These were the words from Madame Bessarabo, suspected murderess of her first husband and confessed assassin of the second one.

When a police investigator came upon an abandoned trunk at a railway station, as was the case with the trunk consigned by Hera Mirtel to Nancy; when, moreover, he espies blood trickling through the bottom onto the cement floor of the baggage room; and when on opening the trunk he finds therein a man's dead body folded in two, ankles strapped to neck and the whole bundle hastily wrapped up in a mackintosh—he somewhat naturally concludes that a murderer or murderess has been at work. When, in addition, after a story woven of futile lies, the dead man's wife confesses that it was she who killed him the French authorities place the woman in a cell at St. Lazaire prison, precisely as they did Hera Mirtel charged with murder. Not a single one of her attitudes since the imprisonment has indicated that Hera Mirtel as much as recognizes her guilt for the killing.

One of her intimate literary friends, likewise a woman, has, indeed, publicly suggested that at the moment of the shooting Hera might have been in the grip of an occult power. Certain it is that throughout the latter part of the war Hera's quaint salon in the Place La Bruyere attracted a group of nondescripe marquises and c0untesses who made the evocation of spirits a weekly practice. Hera, aided by a dilapidated Italian priest, acted as the high priestess at the seances. On one occasion it is said she called in the ghost of Madame de Pompadour, and so impressive was the confab held between the hostess medium and the Eighteenth Century beauty that the witnesses thereafter denounced the decadence of the French Republic as hotly as they extolled the blessings of the bygone Empire.

It would remain to be seen by what means Hera Mirtel managed to work herself up into a trance at that midnight hour when, lying in her bed, she reached over for the revolver, placed it to her sleeping husband's right temple and fired. If the theory advanced by Hera's literary friend he the right one, the shot that rang out in the darkened bedchamber failed to rouse the murderess into a consciousness of the hideous reality that lay beside her there in the form of a corpse. So little so that Hera languidly put the weapon on its wonted place on the bedside chair, turned over and calmly fell asleep. Her daughter Paulette, from her chamber a few yards down the corridor, heard the sound of the shooting and rushed to her mother's bedroom door. Doubly reflected in some wall mirrors, she espied her stepfather's head reposing on a reddened pillow.

When morning came Hera put on her blue silk bathrobe, ate breakfast, and then set about the packing. Georges Bessarabo's corpse was of considerable bulk. Finding it hard to handle unaided, Hera revealed the truth to the daughter, and from that moment on at least Paulette schemed with the murderess to get the inconvenient baggage out of the way. They brought one of the family trunks down from the garret on the seventh floor. As the mother held the body in position Paulette strapped the ankles to the neck whereupon the corpse was covered with a raincoat and tucked into the trunk, laid on its side for the purpose.

After lunch the two women procured some rope at a nearby market-place fastened down the lid (there was some doubt as to whether the lock would hold), hauled the trunk downstairs, had it loaded on a taxi and driven to the Gare de l'Est, addressed to an imaginary woman at Nancy. Were the whole truth of the murder confined to these limits it would be odd but still possible to accept the theory which attempts to throw the moral responsibility for the crime on some bloodthirsty sprite in possession of Hera Mirtel's soul. There might have been room for the other defence put forward by the woman's partisans—namely that the motive behind her act was her imperious desire to make reality out of some of the romance which, as a poetess, she had dreamed and written during most of her life. But the police soon learned that, a couple of days before the murder, Hera Mirtel had booked a passage to Mexico for herself and Paulette. It became known that the dead broker's pocket-book, containing what was believed to be a large sum of money, had mysteriously disappeared.

Here surely it is not so much Hera Mirtel, the poetess desirous of living her romance, but Madame Bessarabo, wife of the oil promoter, that comes to the fore. It is the same woman who played on the money market and so frequently lost. She had a big settlement to make at the Bourse on the day following the murder. She knew that her husband had just made 'a vast deal in Mexico oil property, on which his commission was to amount to nearly a million francs. Could she have expected that he would bring the entire amount of the commission home with him, when as a matter of fact he had often told his brother that he feared as much as to go to his home himself?

In the morning of the day he was destined to die at his wife's hands Georges Bessarabo deposited several hundred thousand of the newly earned francs at his bank, retaining but some odd thousands in the pocketbook. That was all the wife got out of it after all her planning of murder and the commission of the crime itself.

None of the more sordid accompaniments of her act seem to have impressed Hera Mirtel's mind. In her prison cell she haughtily protested against the accusation of vulgar killing. "I am a creatress," she wrote, "and I cannot destroy. I am not a woman who kills."

Back in her flat for awhile, Hera Mirtel calmly reconstructed the tragic scene of the shooting and that of the packing of the corpse for its railway trip to Nancy. Police officers present noticed that on the mattress covering beneath the spot where lay the. dead man's pillow the linen had been washed and carefully ironed over—so carefully that the hot iron left a trace. As for the pillow itself Madame Bessarabo took it with her to Montmorency villa the day after the murder and burned it in the kitchen stove. She flung the revolver into a little lake near the villa, rowing out in the company of Paulette. She gave the police these and other details with the nonchalance of a woman talking to her grocer.

Passion? Yes there was some talk of passion in her first defence after the arrest at Montmoreucy. Her husband she said had been for long enamored of a stenographer. She reproached him for it on the night of the murder, she said, and he then grabbed her by the shoulders and shook her. She fired in self-defence, she insisted, as he had threatened to kill her. In the early flutter of lying, when an examining judge confronted her with the story of the trunk found at Nancy, Madame Bessarabo blundered into a yarn to the effect that her husband had fled from Paris because of an approaching financial catastrophe. She had sent her daughter to his ofiice the morning after the murder with a forged letter announcing the flight.

Seven years ago when her first husband was found dead in his study, with a note in what seemed his handwriting saying he had committed suicide Hera Mirtel. then Madame Jacques, gave it out to all who would hear that he killed himself to escape the shame of bankruptcy. Some months later, however, in Mexico, where her dead husband's property was located she realized nearly a million francs from the sales of his real estate alone. Now the police want M. Jaeques' body exhumed for another examination. In both cases. the fatal bullet entered at the right temple and came out at the left.

== Selected works ==
- Loupita : mœurs mexicaines (E. Sansot, 1907)
- Fleurs d'ombre, suivies de : Fleurs d'aube, Fleurs de lumière. (Paris, E. Sansot, 1910)
- Renée Vivien (1910)
- Leur proie : histoire contemporaine dédiée à toutes celles qui furent leur proie (1912)
- Alphonse de Lamartine et la poésie contemporaine (1913)
- Une doctoresse aux Alpes
- Complaintes de guerre (1916)
- De la Patrie à la matrie, ou du bagne à l'Éden (1920)
