= Quispe =

Surname

Quispe is a common Quechua surname and, more rarely, given name. The word (qispi in Southern Quechua and kishpi in Kichwa) means "free".

== People with the surname ==
=== Art and photography ===
- Diego Quispe Tito (1611–1681), Peruvian painter
- Nicario Jiménez Quispe (born 1957), Peruvian-American retablo maker

=== Music ===
- Lorenzo Palacios Quispe (1950–1994), Peruvian singer and musician
- Wendy Sulca Quispe (born 1996), Peruvian singer

=== Politics and law ===
- Felipe Quispe (1942–2021) Bolivian historian and politician
- Rafael Quispe (born 1969), Bolivian indigenous leader and politician
- Santos Quispe (born 1982), Bolivian doctor and politician
- Iris Flores Quispe (born 2000), Bolivian politician

=== Sports ===
- Fortunato Quispe Mendoza (born 1934), Bolivian-born Dominican Republic football manager
- Crispin Quispe (born 1946), Bolivian long-distance runner
- Rafael Farfán Quispe (born 1975), Peruvian footballer
- Rosemary Quispe (born 1983), Bolivian long-distance runner
- Ronald Quispe (born 1988), Bolivian race-walker
- Piero Quispe (born 2001), Peruvian footballer
- Valeria Quispe (born 1997), Bolivian triple jumper

=== Other ===
- Quispe Sisa (1518–1559), Inca princess
- Severo Aparicio Quispe (1923–2013), Peruvian friar
- Ciro Quispe López (born 1973), Peruvian bishop
- Manuel Quispe (died 2004), Q'ero elder and medicine man

== Elsewhere ==
- The Quispe Girls (orig. Las niñas Quispe), 2013 Chilean motion picture

== See also ==
- Quishpe, variant spelling
