= Deep Rivers =

Novel by Peruvian writer José María Arguedas

- First edition
- Author: José María Arguedas
- Original title: Los ríos profundos
- Translator: Frances Horning Barraclough
- Language: Spanish
- Genre: Novel
- Publisher: Editorial Losada (Buenos Aires)
- Publication date: 1958
- Publication place: Peru
- English publication date: 1987
- Media type: Print
- ISBN: 978-0292715332
- Preceded by: Diamantes y pedernales (1954)
- Followed by: El Sexto (1961)

Deep Rivers (Spanish: Los ríos profundos) is the third novel by Peruvian writer José María Arguedas. It was originally published by Editorial Losada in Buenos Aires in 1958, received the Peruvian National Culture Award (Premio Nacional de Cultura) in 1959, and was a finalist in the William Faulkner Foundation Ibero-American award (1963). Since then, critical interest in the work of Arguedas has grown, and the book has been translated into several languages.

According to critics, this novel marked the beginning of the current neo-indigenista movement, which presented, for the first time, a reading of indigenous issues from a closer perspective. Most critics agree that this novel is one of Arguedas' masterpieces.

The title of the work (Uku Mayu in Quechua) alludes to the depth of the Andean rivers, which rise in the top of the Andes. It also relates to the solid and ancestral roots of Andean culture, which, according to Arguedas, are the true national identity of Peru.

== Context ==
The last years of the 1950s were very fertile for Arguedas' literary production. The book appeared when Indigenismo was in full swing in Peru. Education Minister at the time, Luis E. Valcárcel, organized the Culture Museum, an institution that contributed decisively to indigenous studies. Moreover, with the publication of Deep Rivers, the growing reception to Arguedas' work began, both in Peru and throughout the continent.

== Composition ==
The genesis of the novel was the story "Warma kuyay" (part of the collection of short stories entitled Water, published in 1935), one of whose characters is the child Ernesto. This Ernesto is unmistakably the same as the Deep Rivers character. A text of Arguedas that was published in 1948 in the form of autobiography (Las Moradas, vol. II, No. 4, Lima, April 1948, pp. 53–59) took shape as the second chapter of the novel under the title "Los Viajes". In 1950, Arguedas wrote the essay "The novel and the problem of literary expression in Peru" (La novela y el problema de la expression literaria en el Peru), in which he announced the existence of the novel project. The push to complete the novel emerged years later in 1956, while conducting ethnographic fieldwork in the Mantaro Valley. He then worked hard to its completion. Some texts of ethnographic study were attached to the story, such as the etymological explanation of "zumbayllu" or magical spinning top.

== Plot ==
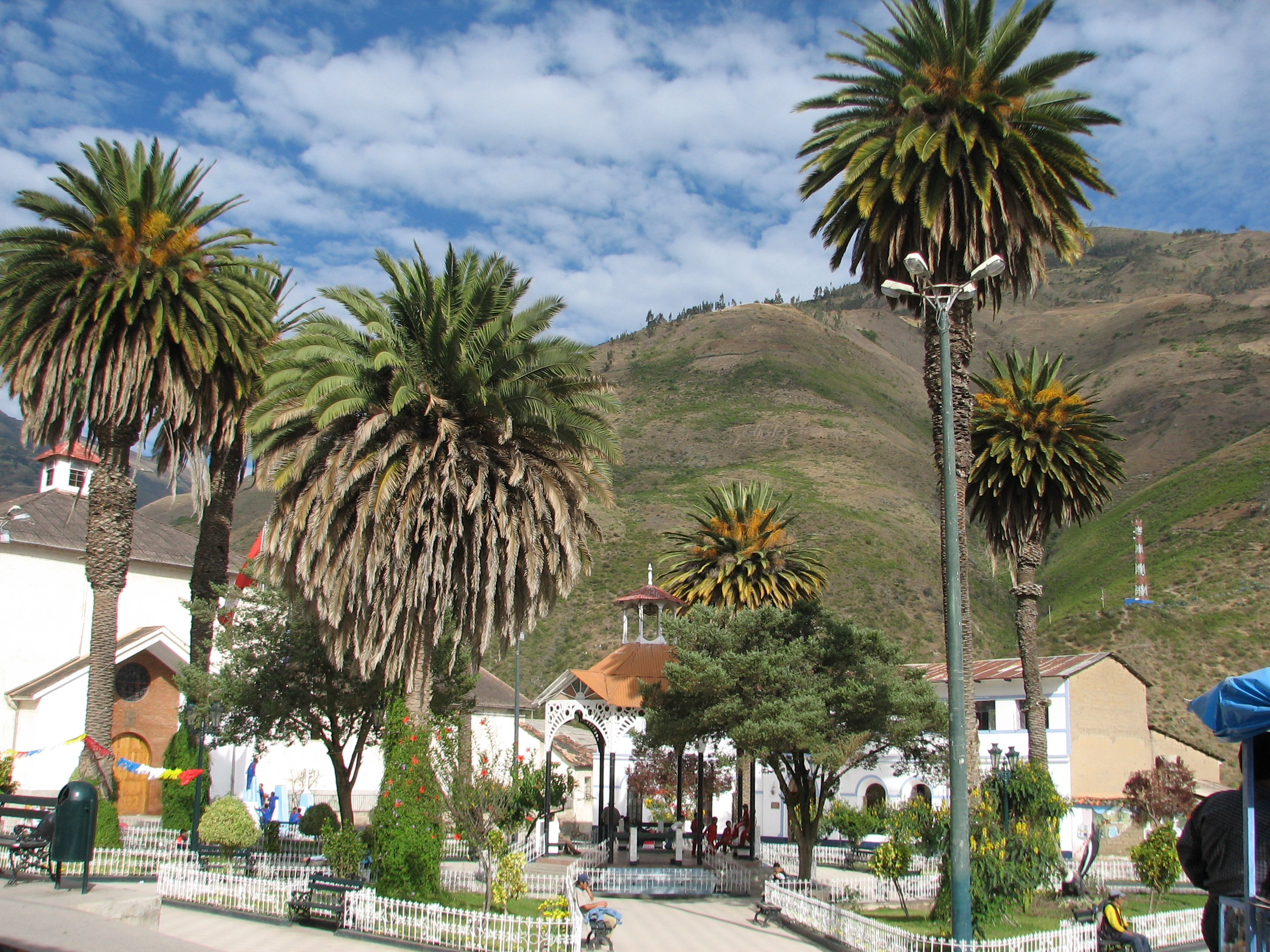
Main square of Abancay, one of the settings of the novel.

The novel describes the maturation process of Ernesto, a 14-year-old who must confront the injustices of the adult world that he becomes a part of, and who is required to take sides. The story begins in Cuzco, where Ernesto and his father Gabriel arrive. Gabriel, an itinerant lawyer, is looking for a rich relative called "El Viejo" (the old one), in order to ask for work and shelter. But he does not succeed. He then recommences his wanderings through many cities and villages of southern Peru. In Abancay, Ernesto is enrolled as a boarder at a religious school while his father continues his travels in search of work.

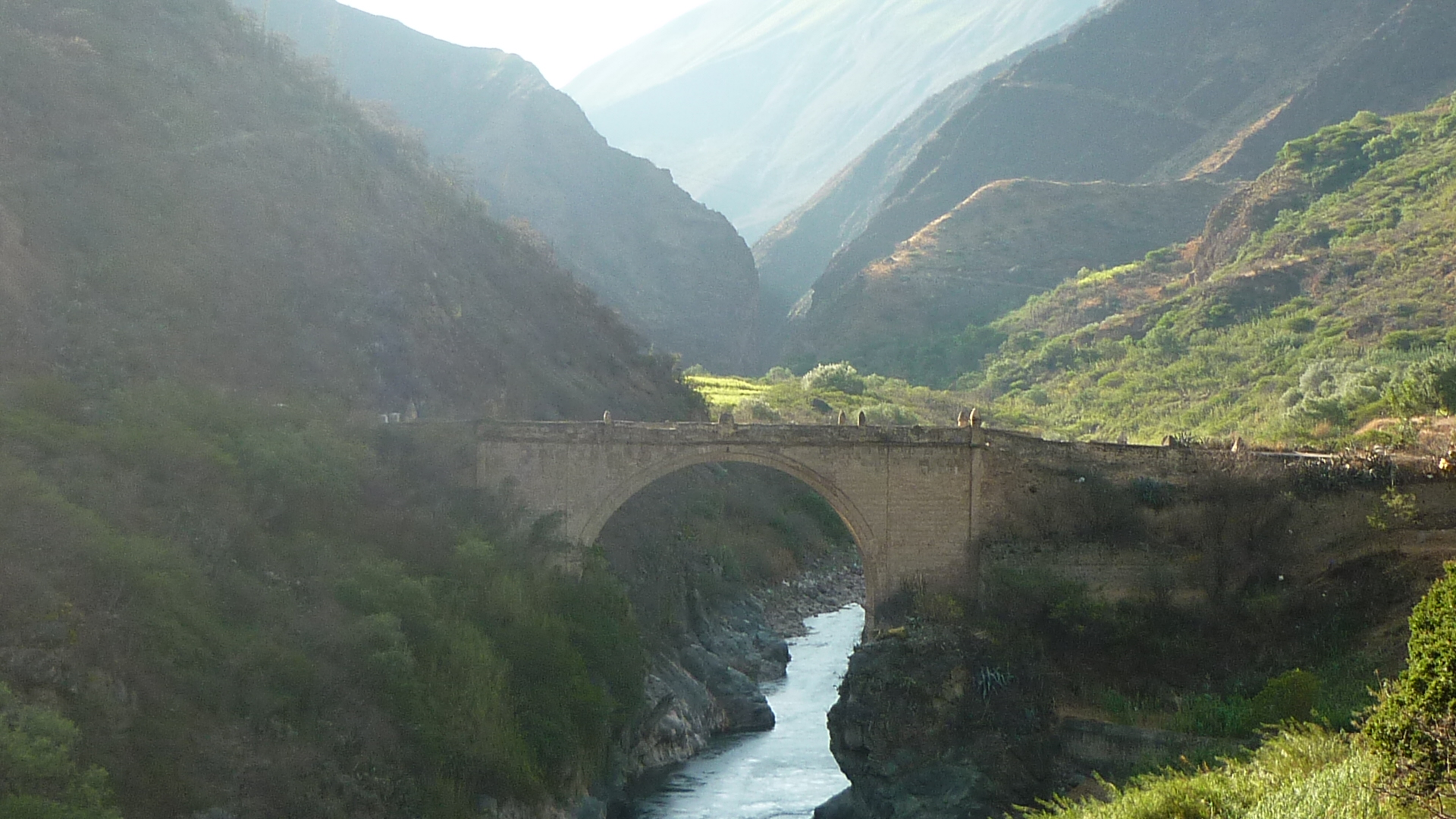
View of the bridge over the Pachachaca River, Abancay, one of the settings of the novel.

Ernesto then has to live with the boarding students who are a microcosm of Peruvian society and where cruel and violent behaviour is the norm. Later, outside the boundaries of the school, a group of chicheras mutiny, demanding the distribution of salt, and a mass of Indian peasants enter the city to ask for a mass for the victims of epidemic typhus. This pushes Ernesto into a profound awareness: he must choose the values of liberation rather than economic security. This completes a phase of the learning process. The novel ends when Ernesto leaves Abancay and goes to a ranch owned by "El Viejo", situated in the valley of the Apurimac, awaiting the return of his father.

== Analysis ==
"With deep rivers Arguedas's work reached a wide continental distribution. This novel fully develops the lyrical potentialities that lay in Arguedas' prose from the beginning. Offering the story from the perspective of an introverted teenage character, to some extent autobiographical, this narrative of internal examination presents however, from its first line, a distressing reflection on reality, on the nature of the Andean world and its relations with westernized sectors. One of the merits of Deep Rivers is its achievement of a high degree of consistency between the two facets of the text. With regard to the revelation of the meaning of the Indian reality, Deep Rivers repeats certain dimensions of Yawar Fiesta, Arguedas's previous novel: its contextualization within the Andean, the emphasis on the opposition between such a universe and the coastal one, the assertion of power and the Quechua people of the Andean culture, etc. The chapters recounting the revolt of the chicheras and settlers insist on showing that hidden capacity. Arguedas liked to point out that the action of the settlers, although treated in the novel as magical motivations, foreshadowed the peasant uprisings that occurred in reality a few years later. The subjective side of Deep Rivers is focused on the efforts of the protagonist to understand the world around him, and to place himself within it as a living whole. Such a project is in extreme conflict: on one hand, on the level of subjectivity, a mythical vision of indigenous descent affirming the unity of the universe and the sharing of all items in a harmonious destiny works; on the other hand, contrary to the above, the experience of immediate reality highlights the deep division in the world and its history of tears and strife, stories that force the protagonist to choose in favor of one side of reality and fight against the other. His ideal of integration, a most passionate one, as it originates in his fragmented interiority, is doomed to failure. To participate in the world is not to live in harmony; it is exactly the opposite, to internalize the conflicts of reality. This is the hard lesson that Deep Rivers chronicles. On the other hand, in order to capture the double movement of convergence and dispersion, or unity and disharmony, this novel builds a dense and beautiful symbolic system that creatively retells certain indigenous myths and gives them fresh life. In this respect the novel functions as a dazzling lyrical operation. Deep Rivers is not the most important work of Arguedas; it is however, without a doubt, the most beautiful and perfect."

== Style and narrative technique ==
Mario Vargas Llosa, who along with Carlos Eduardo Zavaleta was the first to develop the "modern novel" in Peru, recognizes that Arguedas, although not developing modern techniques in his narratives, is nevertheless much more modern than other writers who respond to the characteristic nineteenth century classical model, that of the "traditional novel", as in the case of Ciro Alegría. Vargas Llosa says of it:

"With the stories Agua (Water) and Los rios profundos (Deep Rivers), after the progress he had made Yawar Fiesta, Arguedas had perfected his style as much as his technical resources, which, without spectacular innovations or experimental daring, still reached full functionality in this novel. [These technical recources] provide the persuasive power without which no fiction can come alive before the reader nor pass the test of time."

Vargas Llosa recognizes the emotional impact reading Deep Rivers left him, which unambiguously qualifies it as a masterpiece.

Vargas Llosa also highlights Arguedas mastery of the Spanish language in this novel using flexible Spanish, which brings to light the different shades of issues and peculiarities of the world exposed in the work.

Arguedas, a bilingual writer, succeeds in "quechuization" of Spanish: what some characters say in Quechua is translated to Spanish, sometimes including those speeches in italics in the original language. This does not happen often, but as often as needed to make the reader see that these are two cultures with two different languages.

== The zumbayllu ==
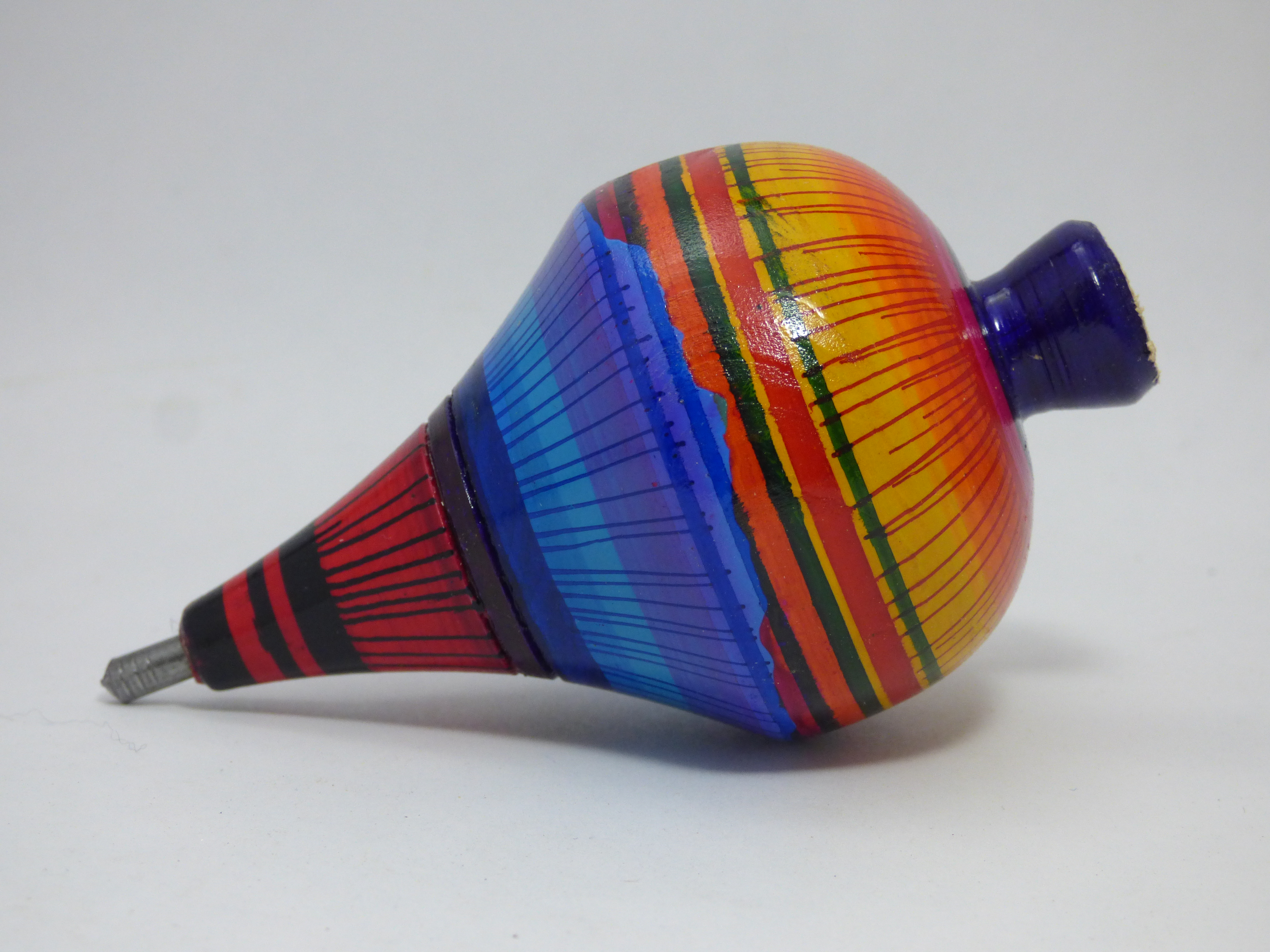
The zumbayllu or trompo

The zumbayllu or spinning top is the quintessential magical element of the novel.

"The ball (of the top) was made of a store-bought coconut, from those tiny grey coconuts that come in cans; the spike was large and thin. Four round holes, like eyes, emanated from the sphere."

These holes produce the typical buzzing sound when spun, which give the object its name. There is also a more powerful type of zumbayllu made from a deformed object but without being round (winku) and with the quality of sorcery (layka).

For Ernesto, the zumbayllu is the ideal instrument for capturing the interplay between objects. As such, its functions are varied, but it is first used to send messages to distant places. Ernesto believes that his voice can reach the ears of his absent father by chanting the zumbayllu. It is also a pacifying object, a symbol of restoring order, as in the episode where Ernesto gives his zumbayllu to Anauco. But it is also a purifying element of negative spaces, and it is under that belief that Ernesto buries his zumbayllu in the backyard of the toilets, in the same place where older inmates sexually abused a mentally disabled woman. The zumbayllu purifies the land and flowers start to sprout, which Ernesto then decides to place in the woman's tomb.
