= Pishtaco =

Andean mythological figure

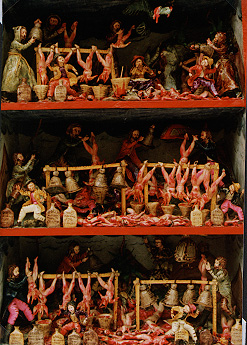
Pishtako, Peruvian Retablo, Ayacucho

A pishtaco (in Northern Quechua "slaughterer, cutthroat"), ñaqaq (in Southern Quechua, similar meaning) or kharisiri (in Aymara,"slaughterer") is a folkloric boogeyman figure in the Andes region of South America, particularly in Peru and Bolivia, which extracts the fat of its victims.

It is believed to have originated in Spanish conquistadors' practice of using Indigenous Peruvians' corpse fat as treatment for wounds and illnesses.

== Nomenclature ==
In central Peru it is called pishtaco (in Central and Northern Quechua, meaning "slaughterer", from pishtay, "behead, cut the throat") and south of the Andes ñaqaq, naq'aq, ñaq'a'q (Note: Other forms:niakaq, ñakaq) (from Southern Quechua: naqay, also meaning "to behead or cut the throat of") or called kharikhari ("cutter") in the Aymara language, depending on the region.

It is called by the Aymara names kharisiri (var. karisiri "slaughterer") or lik'ichiri (Note: Lik'ichiri is also the name of a mountain in Bolivia.) ("fat-maker") in the Bolivian Altiplano, lik'ichiri in southern Bolivia.

== Legend ==
The typical pishtaco in Andean lore is an attacker targeting indigenous victims to extract the human fat (Spanish: unto "ointment") for various commercial purpose.

He is often given a white male racial profile (or mestizo), often said to be armed with a long knife, with which he beheads, disembowels, or dismembers his victims; thus immediately killing the victim. But the pishtaco may also leave no visible wound on the victim, but cause a fatal condition incurring death after a few days. (Note: Ledesma citing José Martinez Gamboa (2003), Nilo Escriba Palomino (2012) and other sources.) This is possible by stunning the victim with magic powder and extracting the fat from the anus. He could be a nocturnal attacker or more of a marauder of the countryside, waylaying solitary travelers.

His perceived professional status, and consequently his garb and purpose of usage for the obtained fat, has transformed depending on the epoch, but the pishtaco has consistently been seen as a powerful gringo figure. The original pishtaco lore (of the Conquistador era), held that Spanish soldiers collected Indian fat to treat their wounds. Later in the eighteenth century, (Note: Beginning of the 18th century for the Bethlehemite friars developing the reputation. See below.) the nakaq ("butcher") subtype appeared which were conceived of as knife-slashing priests. and at some time came it came to be believed that the pishtaco used the fat to make better church bells, or polish the faces on the saints' statues. (Note: Taussig (1987) Shamanism, p. 238 apud Williams.) Later of his avatars were a man on horseback or driving an automobile, usually plantation owners (hacendado) from the age of slavery onward into most of the 20th century. The fat was for greasing firearms, but also seen as being used to lubricate machinery on sugar processing plants, etc. (Note: And animal fat or tallow was indeed usually used to grease machinery.)(cf,§ Greasing modern machinery). Beside pharmaceuticals, cosmetic usage became part of the lore by the 19th century, where the fat was allegedly used for both medicine and soap-making, (Note: Ledesma citing Vazquez (2018), p. 143.) and this sort of talk about the kharisiri fat used for has persisted into the 1990s. Additional lore about the kharisiri is that they engage in cannibalism: they will make chicharrones from human flesh and sell them or eat them, together with eating mote (hominy) made of teeth instead of corn.

On balance, the pishtaco is more of a cannibal than vampire. However, Mary Weismantel (2001) has given the generalization that "pishtaco is nearly always a vampirelike white man..", and wrote that instead of eviscerating or maiming, they would sometimes drain the victim's "body fluids". (Note: Weismantel (1997a) "White Cannibals: Fantasies of Racial Violence in the Andes", pp. 10–11 apud Stein (2003)) In conference she has described the Andean pishtaco as "an evil priest who sucked the fat from Indians".

The "white bogeyman" is another characterization. (Note: Weismantel (2001), p. xxvi; Weismantel (2000). "Race Rape: White Masculinity in Andean Pishtaco Tales" Identities 7 (3): 498. doi 10.1080/1070289X apud Musharbash & Presterudstuen (2020).)

In the manifestation of the fear during the economic chaos of the Alan García administration (1980s), government ID card-carrying ñakaqs were rumored to be dispatched to collect fat as vital ingredient to some sort of medicine, whose sales were used to defray the foreign debt (cf. Nicario's work under § The arts and media)

=== Protection and cure ===
The wayruru beans that are brilliantly red and black colored can be made into amulets to ward against kharisiri. Once afflicted with the wasting away condition after fat has been robbed by the kharisiri, the only cure, apart from killing the kharisiri itself, is to administer purchased human fat that needs to be burned using this wayruru bean and a white egg. The only ways to survive a pishtaco attack after the fact are to kill the pishtaco or to purchase human fat and burn it with wayruru beans and an egg, believed somehow to replenish the fat lost.

Note that the foregoing prescribed cure is based on anecdote, and the sick man (bleeding diarrhea and vomiting) recovered after supposed use of human fat, which could be expensively bought (For further discussion as modern commodity, cf. § Greasing modern machinery).

Anthropologist Juan Antonio Manya records the belief that one may gain protection from a kharisiri by chewing chancaca, eating earth, or showing a clove of garlic that has been pierced by a needle.

The targets of kharisiri attacks are usually adults rather than children or the elderly.

=== Sacaojos ===
Thus the kharisiri which generally avoid bringing children to harm can be distinguished from the sacaojos (meaning "eye snatchers" or "extractor of eyes", legend from the 1980s) that preys on children, though both beings are equivalents of pishtaco. The sacaojos is a version of the pishtaco or nakaq, as according to the cholo population (during the 1980s economic crisis). The rumors detailed machine gun-toting gringo doctors, accompanied by black men serving as aide or bodyguard, going into shantytowns to harvest children's eyes for export. Other rumors made claims of a special contraption used to extract the eye, or extraction of kidney and suet. And in 1988 young tourists accused of being kidnapping sacaojos were detained and nearly lynched. (Note: Portocarrero Maisch, Gonzalo et al. (1992) Sacaojos: Crisis social y fantasmas coloniales, pp. 48–49, 49– 53, etc. apud G. Williams.) It is noted that the lore of the sacamanteca ("fat-snatcher") was widespread back in Spain in the early 20th century, appearing in the popular literature.

=== Other observations ===
According to anthropological researcher Ernesta Vasquez del Aguila, the pishtaco is considered to be "untouchable" because he has "the defence of important institutions", whereas the pishtaco's victims are relatively systemically vulnerable.

== Colonial background ==
The legend of the pishtaco dates back at least to the 16th century. Conquistadores were known to treat their wounds with their enemies' corpse fats, and contemporaries Cristóbal de Molina (1570s) and Antonio de Herrera y Tordesillas (1601) wrote about the rumors about the unto (human grease ointment) that developed where by the Indigenous Andeans believed the Spaniards were there to collect the fat from them to use in this unto as the only cure for a certain illness, or to treat their sores. Spaniards were also said to have killed natives and boiled their corpses to produce fat to grease their metal muskets and cannons, which rusted quickly in the humid Amazon.

Anthropologist Efraín Morote Best asserted that pishtacos became associated especially with the order of Bethlehemite friars as a malicious rumor that spread at the beginning of the 18th century; in fact the order had cared for the sick and buried the dead, and took up alms collections on remote roads, possibly because the order's founder, Peter of Saint Joseph de Betancur, was known to clean wounds with his mouth in an expression of humility. This order of friars no longer exists, (Note: The order or Bethlehemite Brothers dissolved in 1820, was technically restored in 1984 following the beatification of Betancur in 1980 by Pope John Paul II.) and in modern tellings, the accusations of pishtacos have henceforth fallen on mestizos and Caucasians. The name nanaq was first attested in 1723 as a throat-cutter and already identified with the priesthood. (Note: García Hierro (2005) citing Ansión (1989), p. 70.)

The Asháninka in the Peruvian Amazon believe in the present day believe the pishtaco (and the primordial whites) to be the wayward spawn of the (Incan) viracochas, fished out of the lake by a disobedient son of the shaman Inca, and came to be called "Franciscans" In Andean myth Viracocha is a creation god associated with Lake Titicaca, near where he built the world. The fair-skinned denizens there were also called viracochas.

The present-day pishtacos inherits some colonial traits, but are clearly remade in modern reincarnation. Thus the modern nakaq has three main uses for human fat: remedy (old), making resonant bells, and oiling machinery (new). The use of fat in casting bells for better sound is in-between: it is latter-day lore, but vaguely hails back to old association with the Church (cf. § Ecclesiastic pishtaco). (Note: Sifuentes (1989), pp. 72–73 also paraphrased in English by Mayer (1992). Mayer also quoted by Kristal)

=== Ecclesiastic pishtaco ===
Morote Best finds that the stereotype of the pishtaco (or rather the ñak'aq) now conformed exactly with the characteristics of the Betlemitas (Bethlehemites), so that they were seen as wearing brown habits (like the Bethlehemites (Note: The Bethlehemites were dressed like the Capuchin monks (brown firars) — though Rubli Kaiser's describing the monks in Mexico.)), and waylaying people (in the manner similar to the brothers asking for alms on the highways). (Note: Spedding (2005), p. 39 citing Morote Best (1951) and Gose (1994).)

The modern lore of the kharisiri associates him with a whole list of ecclesiastical elements, like the bread (of the sacrament) or the Book of the Tata Cura ("daddy priest" who collects alms), and he is seen as using the human fat in casting bells of superior sound (as with the nakaq above), or turn them into holy oils and candles, or to polish the faces on the plaster busts of saints.

José María Arguedas records a story "Los pishtacos" taken down in Lima. The story is set in the early years of the Peruvian Republic (c. 1820s or after), when certain individuals would kill people and use the harvested grease in the foundry to cast the bell, and the more gifted the voice of the victim, the better sounding the bell turned out to be. (Note: Arguedas (2013) [1970] cited by Molinié Fioravanti (1991), p. 83)

The Bolivian kharisiri had been widely portrayed as dead Franciscan monks wearing broad Franciscan hats until the 1950s, magically removing the kidney fat from the Aymara, and the bishop would make holy oil out of it. (Note: But around the 1970s there was as shift, and the kidney fat were seen as fueling electricity in North America.)

Artist Nicario Jiménez portrays the pishtaco harvesting fat for their bells in the guise of a Franciscan monks and sets this scene in the colonial period (cf. Nicario's work under § The arts and media).

== Techno-pishtacos ==
The pishtaco, in modern times, has stood as a symbol for the fear of commodification of Indigenous bodies by white and foreign powers, and for the exploitative implementation of capitalism across Latin America and specifically in Peru that puts predominantly Indigenous as well as Black and Mestizo people at a disadvantage.

The modern version pishtaco was regarded as driving fancy cars like a Mercedes-Benz.

In Huacho, around the year 1983, pishtaco imagery was predominantly associated with the Villasol road-building company (or sometimes the Ministry of Public Works). Rumors circulated about murdered Indigenous people's bodies being used to uphold bridges and maintain the surrounding landscape; these rumors were most likely allegorical for the overworking and unworkable conditions of the company.

In the aftermath of the killings and disappearances in Peru, part of the Truth and Reconciliation Commission (or CVR, Comisión de la verdad y reconciliación) was the Integral Program of Reparations, which involved exhumations to confirm deaths or discover the "disappeared", in which the surviving family of the ascertained victim received a sum of about 3,000 Euros. But rather than the remains being respectfully reinterred, the families complained the remains were lumped together and possibly sold for profit as crushed bone material or "flavor enhancers" to industries or as cadavers to medical facilities.

Though in a different country, powerful white men (or organization) has been rumored in Honduras of kidnapping children for experimental usage, and the U.S. CIA has been accused in the rumor.

=== Greasing modern machinery ===
The modern pishtaco or ñaktaq was seen as needing human fat oil to run anything from the manufacture of metals and drugs all the way to the US rocket ships. (Note: Gose (1986), p. 297 citing Szeminski & Ansión (1982), p .212)

A long-standing piece of lore allegedly since colonial times sugar mill machinery needed human fat as grease, especially of children. Later since the 1950s, the word had spread that jet aircraft engines could not start without human fat, and in the 1960s, rumors that the U. S. Air Force was trying to fatten up children to this end led to parents boycotting sending their children to USAID lunch programs.

Since human fat has become a highly valuable commodity on the international market due to its perceived needs, there have been instances of actual entrepreneurs. In 1969, two men obtained and sold bottles of human grease obtained from killing shepherd women.

Formerly, tallow (such as derived from whale blubber) was used in the lubrication of machinery during the Industrial Age; thus, as anthropologist Andrew Canessa writes, "the uses to which human fat is believed to be put are not fanciful imaginings but based on very practical understandings of what fat was widely used for in the relatively recent past".

==== Pishtacos affair ====
In November 2009, the National Police of Peru alleged that Peruvian gangsters had murdered as many as 60 people for their fat, and sold it to intermediaries in Lima, who then sold the fat to laboratories in Europe for use in cosmetics. The name for the gang, "pishtacos," as well as the details of the alleged criminal plot, played on the Latin American urban legend of the pishtaco, and the incident become known as "the pishtacos affair".

== Journalists as pishtaco ==
The suspicion of pishtaco falling on mestizos and Caucasians means not even benign-seeming professions are spared, be it journalists, scholars, or human aide workers.

Enrique Mayer in discourse relating to the 1983 Massacre of Uchuraccay where 8 journalists were killed by the indigenous comuneros, explaining that the journalists may have been taken to be pishtacos. Mayer makes the point that anthropologists like himself could be taken to be pishtaco, as he thinks happened with Lionel Valée and Salvador Palomino in the 1960s, who were tied up and set to be killed. Peter Gose also writes that "virtually every ethonographer of the Andes including myself has been identified as a ñakaq" at one time or another.

Indigenous people have attacked survey geologists working on the Peruvian and Bolivian altiplano because they believed that the geologists were pishtacos. The work of anthropologists has been stymied because measurements of fat folds were rumored to be part of a plot to select the fattest individuals later to be targeted by pishtacos.

== The arts and media ==
The retablo (altar box) entitled "El Pistaku" by Nicario Jiménez (cf. photo above) shows the evolution of the pishtaco legend over time: the topmost layer represents the Colonial Period when the pishtaco garbed as Franciscans gathering fat with which they will have their bells forged, the middle represents the 1960s where a long-haired white man in a mechanic's overalls need fat to lubricate his airplane engine and factory machinery, and the bottom shows the 1980s, where variously dressed fighters are the special forces collecting fat, and in the mix, a general there for the international purchase of weapons and repayment of foreign debt. (Note: Sales of fat-based medicine to pay towards overseas debt was a real rumor, as aforementioned.)

The pishtaco is prominently referenced in the novel Death in the Andes by Mario Vargas Llosa. In the book, members of the Peruvian Civil Guard investigate the disappearance of three men, the Shining Path guerillas are quickly ruled out and suspicion falls on a locals especially the male and female barkeep, who clearly believe in the cult with pishtaco as the collector of sacrificial lives, and the apu mountain deities requiring sacrifice in order to bring about restitution from, in particular, a debacle highway project, thus restore the local economy. Vargas failed to take account of the pishtaco lore as motive for the locals killing 8 journalists when he headed the commission to report on the Massacre of Uchuraccay, but introduced pishtaco in this later novel.

Pishtacos are primary antagonists in the episode "The Purge" in the ninth season of the TV series Supernatural. The show represents pishtacos as having a lamprey-like appendage coming from their mouth, with which they suck out human fat. The episode revolves around two pishtacos and one human started a weight-loss retreat, at which the pishtacos secretly feed on clients. One of the pishtacos decides to kill their clients instead, and is killed in turn by the show's monster hunter leads.

Pishtacos are also featured in the Gail Carriger novel Competence, the third book in her Custard Protocol series. The crew of the Spotted Custard travel to the Peruvian Andes in search of a supposed newly discovered species of vampire that is on the verge of extinction. The pishtacos in this story are described as being very tall, thin, shock-white haired, and red-eyed with a single columnar tooth for fat-sucking instead of the traditional elongated canine teeth of vampires for blood-sucking. This appearance is a result of the transformation from human to pishtaco.

Pishtacos play a prominent role in the 2018 edition of the Call of Cthulhu adventure module, Masks of Nyarlathotep, where their mythology is linked to the Lovecraftian entity, Nyarlathotep.

Pishtacos also appear as minor supporting characters in the first novel of Josh Erikson's Ethereal Earth series, Hero Forged.

In the 2018 video game Shadow of the Tomb Raider, pishtacos appear as mythical creatures who hunt members of Trinity, the organization that serves as game's main antagonist.

== See also ==
- emu oil and horse oil – dermatological uses
- Sugar refinery#history – animal blood was once used
- Soap made from human corpses – Alleged Nazi atrocity
- Kan'o Haruhide – famously quipped on exploitation that for "sesame oil and peasants: the more your grind the more you get"
- Sacamantecas – Spanish name for a bogeyman or criminal that kills for human fat
- Anchanchu – legendary Aymara creature
