= Nicario Jiménez Quispe =

Peruvian-American retablo maker (born 1957)

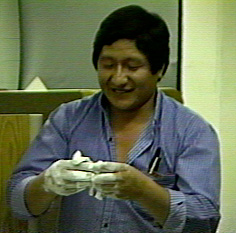
Nicario Jiménez Quispe

Nicario Jiménez Quispe (born in 1957) is a Peruvian-American maker of the Peruvian retablo or the retablo ayacuchano.

He was born in the village of Alcamenca in Ayacucho, Peru, high in the Andes mountain range.

== Life ==
Nicario Jiménez Quispe (Quispe is his mother’s name) is a master artisan of the craft of making retablos. He was born 1957 in a small highland Andean village near Ayacucho.

He has attended the University of San Marcos in Lima, and other universities in Peru,studying sculpture. He is a fourth generation retablo artist, and the family trade goes back to his father, grandfather, and his great-grandfather, which he has felt the attraction to from an early age, and he crafted his first piece at the age of 5 or 6.

Political violence and the fighting between the Peruvian Army and the Marxist Sendero Luminoso (“Shining Path”) guerrillas around Ayacucho has forced many peasant families lie his in the area to migrate to the capital city of Lima, where they make and sell their crafts commercially.

A decade after moving, Nicario Jiménez had his first chance to display his retablos alongside those of his father in a Lima gallery. The quality of and unique style of his work quickly caught the attention of many Peruvian and foreign connoisseurs of retablo folk art. In 1986 he opened his own workshop-gallery in Lima.

He has exhibited his retablos in museums and galleries in Peru and abroad. He has lived back and forth between his home country and the United States during the 1980s, until finally settling in Naples, Florida.

In 2012, he was the recipient of a Florida Folk Heritage Award.

His work has appeared in major museum exhibitions, including the Smithsonian Institution where they are part of the permanent collection. Nicario has taught at universities and international conferences, and his work is in many prestigious art collections. Through his works, Nicario Jimenez, the "artist of the Andes," has shared the art form of the altarpiece with audiences around the world.

== Work ==
He makes traditional Andean altarpieces, small wooden boxes filled with figures, animals and other objects that tell a story. His altarpiece figurines are made by hand with a mix of boiled potato and gypsum powder.

His altarpieces represent religious, historical and everyday life events. They can be humorous or political. His works are based on their pre-Hispanic Andean art and family influences. His retablos also feature different stories of the struggles of Latino immigrants and scenes of Hispanic neighborhoods in South Florida where he has made his home.

The artist creates both traditional and innovative pieces. Each generation of the Jiménez families has taken on novel types of themes. Nicorio has portrayed cities of his travels, like New York, and urban infrastructure like Miami International Airport, though this is also an aspect of his assimilating with the culture of the US where he makes his residence.

On traditional pieces, the orthodox cajón San Marcos (St. Mark) is something Nicorio comments about his father and grandfather making them, which turned out to make popular sales to the Caucasian buyer. While works on traditional themes like the Nativity scene was what seemed to be in popular demand, and prospective clients tried to commission different versions, but Nicorio wanted to take a different direction, and create original works on unique themes.

His religious pieces inserts emblematic items from Peruvian culture, for example, the Crucifix (cf. below section) with the coca leaves, and the shaman piece (cf. § Curandero (shaman)) with the guinea pig (cuy)

=== Crucifix ===
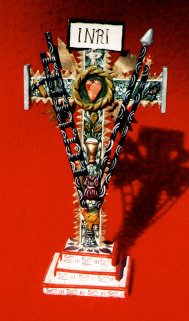
Cross with coca leaves

Nicario Jiménez frequently injects elements that remind us of his Andean heritage. For example, this Crucifix has three coca leaves below the heart of Christ. He says he put them there to remind us that coca leaves (not cocaine) play an important role in Indigenous Andean cultures.

=== Curandero (shaman) ===
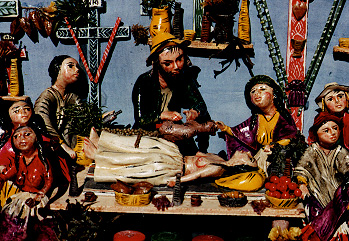
Curandero (shaman)

The shaman, or curandero (healer) practices traditional folk medicine. He uses various herbs, including coca leaves, and passes a live Andean guinea pig (the cuy) over the body or the patient as a diagnostic tool. The cuy is then killed and its entrails studied to diagnose the illness and prescribe treatment, which is a combination of traditional medicinal herbs and Christian practices.

=== Pishtaco ===
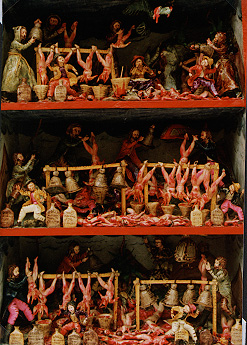
Pistaku retablo of similar composition as the work discussed. (Top tier) colonial period, (middle) 1960s, (bottom) modern, with helicopter and militants in camouflage combat outfits

Pishtaco (Pistaku, "cutter of throats", from Quechua: pishtay 'to slit a throat') according to the oral tradition among the Andean people, are foreigners who use knives and machetes to extract their fat, and the victims eventually die after a few days. The piece "Pishtaco" by Nicario (which exists in multiple copies of different make) is three-tiered, and the middle tiers is a throw-back to the 1960s (Note: Ulfe (2011), p. 208 guesses the second tier to be the 40s decade.) with hacendado on horseback, also showing automobile and airplane (of models from that age). The military aircraft symbolize state authority, or perhaps the dominant group. (Note: The aircraft represent "whiteness" (blancura) according to Mary Weismantel)

The top tier of the retablo represents the Colonial period and shows the Pishtaco dressed as a Franciscan monks who extract human fat to make church bells.

The middle tier shows a period around the 1960s as aforementioned, with the Pishtaco, wearing a cape, is a long-haired gringo who "uses the grease from his human victims to lubricate airplane engines and factory equipment".

The bottom of the retablo is contemporary, representing a period of 1985–1986 at the start of Alán García's first presidency. The human fat he extracts now not only serves to lubricate airplanes and machinery, but also to pay the external debt and buy weapons. (Note: Ulfe (2011), p. 206, also quoting Nicario Jiménez's statement taken in Naples, Florida, dated 5 February 2003, in which Nicario specifies the '85–86 period, names Gracía and his statement about defaulting on foreign debt.) (Note: A popular tale emerged in the 1980s that President García was sending troops to rob people to collect the fat to discharge the nation's foreign debt. Tale in the anthology of Juan Ansión ed. (1989) Pishtacos de verdugos a sacaojos. Lima: Tarea, Associón de Publicacioines Educativas.)

=== Sendero Luminoso (“Shining Path”) ===
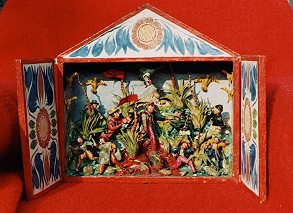
Sendero Luminoso (Shining Path)

In recent years there have been more controversial retablos, such as those showing exploitation and mistreatment of the Indigenous peoples, and the plight of the Andean people caught between leftist guerrillas and the security forces of the State.

He has created a three-tiered retablo featuring the Shining Path (Sendero Luminoso) Marxists. One recurring theme is the way the campesino is caught between the Marxist guerrillas and the military.

=== Yawar fiesta ===
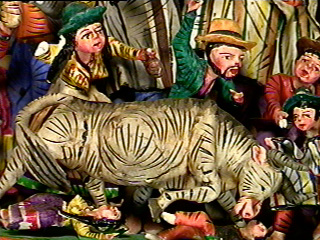
“Yawar fiesta”

José María Arguedas's 1941 novel, Yawar Fiesta ("blood festival") depicts a ritual where a bull named Misitú has a condor tied to its back for the bird to peck at the beast, while the bull is turned loose. The pecking condor symbolizes the indigenous folk resisting Spanish oppression.

Nicario's retablo on this theme preserves the allegory, depicting the conflict between the bull (symbolic of European powers) and the condor (symbolic of pre-Hispanic indigenous folk as well as modern people trying to preserve the traditional ways). One example is photographed 1990, but he has produced many versions of it over the years, in solidarity with the people. In the various scenes, the condor is tied to the back of the bull, who is infuriated and cannot rid itself of the condor, and eventually dies from exhaustion. The condor is then set free. It spreads its wings, and it becomes the symbol of the freedom of the Andean Indigenous peoples.
