= The Fox From Up Above and the Fox From Down Below =

Posthumous novel by José María Arguedas

- Author: José María Arguedas
- Original title: El zorro de arriba y el zorro de abajo
- Translator: Frances Horning Barraclough
- Language: Spanish
- Publisher: Losada (Buenos Aires)
- Publication date: 1971
- Publication place: Peru
- English publication date: 2000
- Media type: Print
- Pages: 325
- ISBN: 978-0822957188
- Preceded by: Todas las Sangres (1964)

The Fox From Up Above and the Fox From Down Below (Spanish: El zorro de arriba y el zorro de abajo) is the sixth and final novel by Peruvian writer José María Arguedas published posthumously in 1971. It is an unfinished novel, interspersed with some personal and intimate diaries where the author relates the torments overwhelming him while writing the novel, finally announcing his impending suicide. Complementing the work are two letters and an epilogue. The novel depicts the consequences of accelerated modernization of the port of Chimbote, motivated by the fishing boom; thousands of Andean immigrants arrive, attracted by the opportunity to earn a living in a thriving industrial city, while at the same time they assimilate themselves under the guise of 'modernity', all of which, from the point of the writer, brings dire consequences: loss of Andean cultural identity and its moral degeneracy, succumbing to the vices of the city in bars and brothels.

== Context ==
According to the author's correspondence, the draft of the novel was first conceived in the early months of 1966. In letters to the Spanish editor Carlos Barral dated from that year, Arguedas tells him about a draft novel that would concern anchovy fishermen and the revolution produced by the fishmeal industry on the Peruvian coast. From other sources we know that the novelistic project was originally set in Puerto Supe, which also experienced the fishing boom, but was later displaced by Chimbote, where Arguedas traveled to several times to document and interview fishermen and port workers. It was mid-1968 when it occurred to him to sandwich between the fictional chapters of his novel some personal diaries, the first of which drew on the 10th, 11th, 13th, 15th and 16 May. This "first diary" appeared in the journal Amaru and sparked controversy with the Argentine writer Julio Cortázar, following intemperate criticism that he made regionalist or 'telluric' literature. It was a difficult time for the writer as he encountered a strong depressive crisis, which had already lead him to a previous suicide attempt (in 1966); he lived in continual battle against insomnia and pains in the neck and back. Yet he endeavoured to carry out the project and wrote four chapters (which form the first part of the book), by his accounts on the second and third day sandwiched into the work. The second diary is dated in Museo de Sitio de Puruchuco in Lima, February 1969, and the third day in Chile, in May of that year. In Chile the author also developed the second part of the book, but later announced himself to be mentally unfit to continue. That's when he prepared his suicide and purchased a revolver. In what was labelled as his "Last Diary?" (whose revision is dated October of that year) he said his life would be ended by a bullet; a month later he carried out his threat (November 1969). This was finally inserted into the work, along with an epilogue: a letter the author sent to the editor Gonzalo Losada giving his final provisions on the publication of the work, despite it having been truncated. It has been said with certainty that the writer's death ends the novel.
