= Yawar Fiesta =

1941 novel by José María Arguedas

- First edition
- Author: José María Arguedas
- Original title: Yawar Fiesta
- Translator: Frances Horning Barraclough
- Language: Spanish
- Publisher: Compañía de Impresiones y Publicidad, Lima
- Publication date: 1941
- Publication place: Peru
- English publication date: 1985
- Media type: Print
- Pages: 200
- ISBN: 9780292796010
- Followed by: Diamantes y pedernales (1954)

Yawar Fiesta is the first novel by the Peruvian author José María Arguedas, published in 1941. It is considered as part of the Latin-American indigenista movement. Set in the village of Puquio (in the Southern Sierra of Peru) it depicts the performance of a bullfight in the Andean style (turupukllay) as part of a celebration called 'yawar punchay'. According to critics, it is the most successful of Arguedas' novels, from a formal point of view. The author's effort is appreciated for offering the most authentic version possible of Andean life, without resorting to convention or the paternalism of previous indigenous literature.

== Plot ==
The novel relates one of the most traditional customs of the indigenous communities of Peru: the "Indigenous bullfight", that takes place every year on the 28th of July, the anniversary of the founding of Peru. The indigenous bullfight is a spectacular event where a bull (which wears a "pampon") must confront one or two hundred "Indians" who can be professional toreros or spontaneous "capeadores". The event is accompanied by elements such as music of wakwak'ras (trumpets made from the bulls' horns), traditional chants (huaynos), consumption of hard liquor, usage of dynamite in order to kill the bull, and even death of the participants who were gored during the event. This tradition is threatened by an order from the capital, which prohibits what is considered a 'barbarian' practice. Faced with the refusal of the Indians to comply with the order, the authorities seek a way to allow the bullfights to be performed 'decently': by hiring a professional bullfighter (toreador) who will flight in the 'Spanish' tradition. With this, the very essence of the festival is threatened, but it is ultimately carried out anyway, the Indians reinstating their tradition in the eyes of the village leaders. It is worth noting that Arguedas' story does not mention the tying of a condor to the back of the bull, that is currently the most well-known variant of Yawar Fiesta.

== Composition ==
The theme of an Andean (or 'Indian') style bullfight as the center of a conflict between races and social groups in a village in the Peruvian Andes came to Arguedas when, according to his confession, he attended a bullfight in Puquio in July 1935. On this occasion one of the Indian capeadors (matador assistants), nicknamed Honrao, was gored by the bull. In 1937 Arguedas published two stories which preceded the novel. One entitled "The Dispossession", which appeared in the Lima magazine 'Palabra', No. 4, April (which later became the second chapter of the novel); and the other entitled "Yawar (Festival)", published in the 'Revista Americana', Year XIV, No. 156, in Buenos Aires (which is a primitive draft of the novel). His desire to remake the story was interrupted by his stay at the El Sexto prison, between 1937 and 1938, therefore he could only re-start writing in the second half of 1940, after attending the Indian Congress of Patzcuaro, in Mexico. He was then in Sicuani, where he was teaching at a public school. Taking advantage a school vacation, Arguedas wrote the novel non-stop. One incentive was a competition of Latin-American novels announced by a publisher in the United States: juries gathered in each Hispanic country were to select a representative novel which would be sent to an international jury sponsored by said publisher. In Peru, the national jury consisted of Augusto Tamayo Vargas, Estuardo Núñez and Luis E. Valcárcel, among others. As he progressed on chapters of his novel Arguedas sent them to Lima, to his friend the poet Manuel Moreno Jimeno. The correspondence between them documents Arguedas' work in detail. But he must have been disappointed that his novel was not chosen to represent Peru in the international competition, being displaced by the work of an unknown, José Ferrando, entitled 'Panorama hacia el alba' (Panorama toward dawn). The winner of the international competition was the indigenous novel by Ciro Alegría, 'El mundo es ancho y ajeno' (Broad and Alien is the World), sent on behalf of Chile, where its author was exiled.

== Themes ==
The principal theme is the performance of the Andean-style bullfight. Secondary themes are: the encroachment of white or misti (mestizo) people into Puquio, the abuses and violence of the gamonales (parasitic landlords) towards the Indians, the construction of the road from Puquio to Nazca, and the migration of thousands of Indians to Lima.

== Analysis ==
Antonio Cornejo Polar remarks that

Yawar Fiesta rectifies several basic customs of the traditional indigenous novel. At the same time, more than revealing the oppression and distress of the Indians, this novel seeks to underscore the power and dignity that the Quechua people have preserved in spite of the exploitation and contempt of white people. It is the story of the triumph of these people in their decision to preserve their cultural identity and aspects of their social organization. The victory of the Ayllus against the central government authorities, landowners and "fortified" mestizos is a very unusual episode within the indigenous standard. Moreover, Yawar Fiesta starts treating an issue that will take its full shape much later: the señores that still oppress the indigenous people have been reclaimed by their culture and in this sense they feel closer to their servants than men of the coast. Don Julian is the antecedent of Don Aparicio (Diamantes y pedernales) and Don Bruno (Todas las sangres). From this it follows that Yawar Fiesta examines the possibility of understanding the Andean world, although internally conflicted, as a whole. Opposing it, with all its contradictions, is the Westernized socio-cultural system of the Peruvian coast. In this way the constructing of a sequence begins with expansions and contrasts that will only end with 'El zorro de arriba y el zorro de abajo' (The fox from above and the fox from below). Arguedas was well aware of the need for this process of contextualization: "we can only know the Indian people" he said, "the people that also know, with the same profundity as the people or social groups that have determined what the Indian is at the moment."

Julio Ramón Ribeyro has said of this novel that the author

Traced in it the best possible social and economic sketch of a large village in the Sierra, that has no comparison in our literature for the accuracy of its information and the lucidity of its analysis

Yawar Fiesta has been widely analyzed in Latin American literary criticism for its representation of Andean culture and its role within the indigenista literary movement. Literary scholar Antonio Cornejo Polar highlighted the novel as a key work in José María Arguedas’ career for its integration of indigenous worldview into narrative structure, emphasizing its contribution to discussions on cultural hybridity and social conflict in Peru. The novel has remained part of academic curricula and scholarly debate, reinforcing its status as a significant work of 20th-century Latin American literature.

== Sources ==
- Arguedas, José María: Yawar Fiesta. Lima, PEISA, 2002. Gran Biblioteca de Literatura latinoamericana El Comercio, Tomo 15, con ficha de lectura. ISBN 9972-40-219-3
- Cornejo Polar, Antonio: Historia de la literatura del Perú republicano. Incluida en Historia del Perú, Tomo VIII. Perú Republicano. Lima, Editorial Mejía Baca, 1980.
- Sánchez, Luis Alberto: La literatura peruana. Derrotero para una historia cultural del Perú, tomo V. Cuarta edición y definitiva. Lima, P. L. Villanueva Editor, 1975.
- Vargas Llosa, Mario: La utopía arcaica. José María Arguedas y las ficciones del indigenismo. Fondo de Cultura Económica. México, 1996. ISBN 968-16-4862-5
