= Wiraqucha =

Wiraqucha (Quechua, Hispanicized and mixed spellings Hueracocha, Hueraccocha, Huiracocha, Huiraccocha, Huirajocha, Viracocha, Wiraccocha, Wiracocha) may refer to:

- Viracocha, an Andean divinity
- Viracocha Inca, eighth Sapa Inka (emperor) of the Tawantinsuyu
- Wiraqucha (Cusco), a mountain in the Cusco Region, Peru
- Wiraqucha (Junín), a mountain in the Junín Region, Peru
- Wiraqucha Pirqa
- Luis Viracocha (born 1954)
- Viracocha Patera
- Mysmenopsis viracocha
