= Quishpe =

Quishpe may refer to:

- Salvador Quishpe (born 1971), Ecuadorian politician
- Delfín Quishpe (born 1977), Ecuadorian singer-songwriter and politician
- Carlos Quishpe (born 1991), Ecuadorian cyclist
- Luis Viracocha Quishpe (born 1954), Ecuadorian sculptor

== See also ==
- Quispe, variant spelling
