= Luis Viracocha =

Ecuadorian artist, teacher, and shaman (born 1954)

- Born: Luis Viracocha Quishpe; 1954 (age 71–72); Quito, Ecuador
- Education: Central University of Ecuador
- Known for: Sculpture
- Movement: Abstract art
- Awards: First Prize in Sculpture, Mariano Aguilera Hall (1985)

Luis Viracocha Quishpe (Note: In this Spanish name, the first or paternal surname is Viracocha and the second or maternal family name is Quishpe.) (born 1954) is an Ecuadorian artist, teacher, and shaman.

A native of in Quito, Viracocha is an abstract sculptor who uses stone, wood, and marble to create his artwork. Both his grandfather and father were sculptors.

Luis Viracocha has a bachelor's in applied arts and a doctorate in educational science from the Central University of Ecuador. He studied the restoration of architectural monuments in Venice, and earned a master's degree in Sculpture in Carrara, Italy.

His artwork has been exhibited in various countries outside of Ecuador including the United States, Arab Emirates, China and Austria.

== Awards ==
- First Prize in Sculpture from the Mariano Aguilera Hall, (Quito, 1985)
- Second Prize of the Fifth Symposium of Sculpture, (Italy, 1983)
