= Todas las Sangres =

1964 novel by José María Arguedas

Every Blood
- First edition
- Author: José María Arguedas
- Original title: Todas las sangres
- Language: Spanish
- Publisher: Losada (Buenos Aires)
- Publication date: 1964
- Publication place: Peru
- Media type: Print
- Preceded by: El Sexto (1961)
- Followed by: The Fox From Up Above and the Fox From Down Below (1967)

Every Blood (Spanish: Todas las sangres) is the fifth novel of the Peruvian writer José María Arguedas published in 1964. It is the author's longest and most ambitious novel, being an attempt to portray the whole of Peruvian life, by means of representations of geographic and social scenes of the entire country, although its focus is on the Andean sierra. The title alludes to the racial, regional and cultural diversity of the Peruvian nation. The novel revolves around two fundamental ideas: the danger of imperialist penetration into the country through large transnational companies, and the problem of modernization of the indigenous world.

== Plot ==
The novel starts with the suicide of Don Andres Aragon of Peralta, head of the most powerful family in the village of San Pedro de Lahuaymarca, in the mountains of Peru. His death announces the end of the feudal system that until then has been predominant in the region. Don Andres leaves two sons: Don Fermin and Don Bruno, enemies and rivals, who during the life of their father had already divided his vast property.

The principal conflict revolves around the exploitation of the Apar'cora mine, discovered by Don Fermin on his lands. Don Fermin, a prototypical national capitalist, wants to exploit the mine and bring progress to the region, which his brother Don Bruno opposes. Don Bruno is a traditional landowner and fanatical Catholic, who doesn't want his tenant farmers or Indian slaves contaminated by modernity, which, according to his judgment, corrupts people.

With the arrival of an international consortium - Wisther-Bozart- a dispute over control of the silver mine begins. Don Fermin cannot compete against the enormous transnational corporation, and sees himself forced to sell the mine, which then adopts the name Aparcora Mining Company. Anticipating the need for abundant water to work the mine, the company shows interest in the lands of the town and the neighboring rural communities, requiring that they be sold at ridiculously low prices; this counts on the complicity of corrupt authorities. The company acts as a disintegrating force that does everything necessary to maximize profit, without regard to the damages caused to the townspeople. Then there begins a process of unrest that leads to the mobilisation of peasants led by Rendon Willka, an Indian rebel who has lived in the capital of the country where he has learnt a lot. Under his orders uprisings explode, which are bloodily repressed by forces supporting the government, but which are the forerunners of the final rebellion.

== Characters ==
=== Main ===
- Don Andrés Aragón y Peralta is the old man mentioned at the beginning of the story. He is the head of the most powerful family of the village of San Pedro de Lahuaymarca, a typically feudal region of the Peruvian mountains. In his proudest moment, Don Andres captures a lot of land, displacing other big landowners or feudal lords, as well as Indian rebels. Later he becomes an alcoholic and his family environment disintegrates: his children quarrel among themselves and his wife, disappointed by her family, also starts drinking. Before committing suicide by ingesting poison, Don Andrés curses his two sons, Don Fermin and Don Bruno, whom he accuses of illegally appropriating his properties, and in his will, he bequeaths his last possessions to the Indians.
- Don Fermín Aragón de Peralta is a cold businessman, a representative of national capitalism. Ambitious and obsessed by economic power, he aspires to bring economic progress into the mountains, displacing the traditional order. He believes modernization is necessary to achieve a change in Peru, but with a dose of nationalism. However, he cannot compete with a mining transnational to whom he sells his silver mine. With the money obtained he ventures in the fishing industry, buying flour mills and fish canneries in the port of Supe. He also decides to expand and modernize his mountain estate "La Esperanza". At the end of the novel he will be wounded by a shot from his own brother, Don Bruno.
- Don Bruno Aragón de Peralta is the landowner of the "La Providencia" estate, where he has tenant farmers and Indian slaves. He is violent with his workers, whom he hits and whips without mercy, and sexually abuses the women, the latter being his favourite sport. Against the arrival of modernisation, he defends the maintenance of the feudal system, because he believes that only this ensures that his Indians remain "pure", away from the corruption of money, a position with which he confronts his elder brother, Don Fermin. He is also a religious fanatic who considers that the preservation of said traditional system is a divine order that must be carried out. In the middle of the novel, and after knowing and impregnating a half-caste named Vicenta, he produces a change in his behaviour: he dedicates himself to doing good, distributing his lands to indigenous people and helping other rebels in their struggles against the overlords. He ends as righteous, executing the wicked overlord Don Lucas and trying to murder his brother, which will lead him to prison.
- Demetrio Rendón Willka is an Indian or free rebel from Lahuaymarca. He is a serene, wise, patient, lucid, brave, astute, heroic and chaste man. He represents the new consciousness of the Indians, those who expect to break with the antiquated social structure, but preserving its more positive aspects, like the social community, with the aim of counteracting the harmful effects of the imminent modernisation. He represents then an option for development in contrast with the planned modernisation of Don Fermin and the defence of the old feudal system of Don Bruno. Rendon Wilka is the first son of comuneros who arrives in Lima, where he lives in slums for 8 years, working as a road sweeper, servant, textile and construction worker. He learns to read at night-school and spends time in prison, where he has a political-religious realisation. All that experience makes him feel a new man and he returns to his land determined to lead the fight for the liberation of the Indians. He arrives in the town soon after the death of Don Andres and puts himself at the service of Don Fermin as foreman of the mine. Later Don Bruno names him as administrator of his estate "La Providencia". Finally, he leads the uprising of the Indians and his end is heroic because he dies, shot by the forces of order.

=== Secondary ===
- The kurku Gertrude, a hunchbacked dwarf who is raped by don Bruno, as a result of which she aborts a foetus with bristles.
- Vincenta, the wife of Don Bruno, from whom she has a son, the boy Alberto.
- Matilde, the blond wife of Don Fermin, a "cute and sweet" lady.
- Nemesio Carhuamayo, first foreman of the Indians on Don Bruno's "La Providencia" estate.
- Policarpo Coello, second foreman of the "La Providencia" Indians.
- Adrián K’oto, first ringleader of the "La Providencia" Indian slaves.
- Santos K’oyowasi, second ringleader of "La Providencia" Indian slaves.
- Justo Pariona, Indian driller at the mine.
- Anto, servant of Don Andres. His employer gives him some land in La Esmeralda, where he raises his house. When the mining company expropriate the land, he does not want to abandon his property and blows it up with dynamite together with the steamrollers.
- Hernán Cabrejos Seminario, from coastal Piura, chief engineer of the Apar'cora mine. He is an undercover agent of Wisther-Bozart. When this transnational takes possession of the mine (which adopts the name of the Apar'cora mining company) he is named as its manager. He dies, murdered at the hands of Asunta de la Torre.
- Gregorio, half-caste, chauffeur for the engineer Cabrejos and at the same time a musician who plays the charango (small guitar), who falls in love with Asunta de la Torre. He dies in an explosion that happens inside the mine.
- Perico Bellido, a young accountant in the service of Don Fermin.
- Don Alberto Camargo, captain of Don Fermin's mine.
- Felipe Maywa, Indian chief, Mayor of the indigenous community of Lehuaymarca.
- The Mayor of San Pedro, Ricardo de la Torre.
- Asunta de la Torre, a young member of the aristocratic family from the town of San Pedro, daughter of the Mayor. She is about 35 years old and has a Spanish physiognomy. She is the intended of Don Bruno, whom she rejects. She symbolises virtue and purity. She will murder the engineer Cabrejos, guilty of the ruin of her town which succumbs before the voracity of the mining consortium.
- Llerena, the Subprefect, half-caste, an employee of the Wisther-Bozart company.
- Don Adalberto Cisneros, "El Cholo", Indian, gentleman of Parquina. He is the incarnation of the evil landowner. He mercilessly abuses the Indian comuneros of Paraybamba, from whom he snatches their lands. He threatens to acquire the estates of Don Bruno and Don Fermin.
- Don Aquiles Monteagudo Ganosa, young member of a white family of landowners, travels through Europe and returns to sell its two estates to Don Adalberto.
- Don Lucas is another heartless chieftain, who does not pay wages to his workers and keeps his Indians hungry and ragged. He is murdered by Don Bruno.
- El Zar (The Czar), is the nickname of the president of the Aparcora mining company, He is evil and a homosexual.
- Palalo, loyal servant and intimate companion of El Zar.
- The engineer Velazco, another representative of the Aparcora mining company.
- Don Jorge Hidalgo Larrabure, engineer who resigns from the Aparcora company because he does not agree with its methods.

== Analysis ==
The novel presents the image of a nation subjected to imperialist penetration and, above all, the problem of modernization of indigenous culture. Arguedas attempts to provide a comprehensive portrait of Peru by the representation of geographic and social settings throughout the country, although the narrative focus is on the sierra. The title of the novel expresses the complex national life of Peru, in which 'all bloods' intermingle and compete with each other harshly. But this fight envelops not only Peru but also an imperialist power seeking to manipulate it.

The confrontation between the forces of modernity and a traditional society is the main conflict that the novel addresses. Its large question revolves around the possibility of achieving genuine national development, with the certainty that a historical era of the country has ended, and that a new homeland must be built on its ruins. The destroyed order is the old feudal order. The alternatives facing the imperialist project range from a utopian return to a feudal order, imagined by Don Bruno as a natural system presided by moral principles, to a proposal of national capitalism, as stated by Don Fermin. In the novel these options are invalidated and the moral and historical legitimacy of the other alternative, represented by the rebel Rendon Willka, is emphasized. This alternative could be summarized by his collectivist sensibility (in the social sphere), in his adherence to Quechua values (in the cultural sphere), and a cautious modernization (at both levels).

Willka's project, however, has some components which are more idealistic than realistic, and contains perhaps an insurmountable failing: it is a project limited to the rural highlands, that distrusts and even rejects participation of the proletariat and calls into question the service of political parties. It is a project more cultural than social (although it brings into relief the importance of collectivist organization under the model of indigenous community), and more ethical than political.

In any case, during the course of the novel a consistent reflection on many aspects of Peruvian reality unfolds: in this process, precisely because it is reflective, the novel observes the impossibility of understanding the national dynamics, made up of familiar oppositions, at the margins of the overall structure of the contemporary world.

== Controversy over the work ==
In 1965 the Institute for Peruvian Studies (Instituto de Estudios Peruanos) organized a series of roundtables to discuss the relationship between literature and sociology. The second of these, held on June 23, devoted itself to the discussion of the novel Todas las sangres, with the participation of Arguedas himself. This event was extremely important because it signified the incorporation of Arguedas' narrative into a discussion of the literature of his time.

The roundtable consisted of leftist intellectuals who were admirers of Arguedas. All of them, some cautiously and others openly, criticized the work because it was thought to be a distorted version of Peruvian society: starting with the description of a caste system which had long disappeared in the whole of the Peruvian Andes, and a primitive and caricatural view of social mechanisms. These reviews were devastating for Arguedas, who, according to Mario Vargas Llosa, wrote later that night these heartbreaking lines:

... it was almost proved by two wise sociologists and an economist, [...] that my book Todas las sangres is detrimental to the country, I don't have anything to do in this world anymore. My forces have declined, I think, inevitably.

== Criticism ==
According to Vargas Llosa, the criticisms that were made regarding the work during the roundtable of June 23, 1965 would be valid from a sociological point of view. Obviously, another point of view would be an analysis of the novel as literary fiction. Vargas Llosa argues that the work is also flawed in this respect, that the description of Peruvian society is profoundly false and unconvincing, not because of distance from objective truth, but because of a lack of internal force emanating from the intricacies of the fiction.

By contrast, the British critic and poet Martin Seymour-Smith praised the novel highly:

"Those who by temperament reject the horrors of machinery and man's misuse of it will find rich reward in this, the most poetic of all novels about 'savages'. If Levi-Strauss is a great thinker, and he is (at his best), then what can Arguedas be? Something infinitely larger, certainly."

== Message ==
Arguedas' novel reveals his proposed solution to indigenous problems: Andean culture must not be destroyed, as part of some or other form of modernization that assimilates. Harmonious thinking with nature is accepted, in order to develop a revolutionary mindset that projects a future of well-being and freedom. The national ideal is that of multivariate Peru, with ecological, multicultural and multilingual diversity.

The Peruvian nation can be seen as being more than a national project; it can be said that there are several national cores, but they are not geographically localizable. In the intellectual underworld of Peru, bound to political power, is a subsidiary Western worldview, strongly refuted and distorted by current social historical reality.

== Film adaptation ==
The film adaptation of the novel was directed by Michel Gomez in 1987. The actors Richardo Tosso, Rafael Delucchi, Pilar Brescia, Andres Alencastre, Oswaldo Sivirichi and Juan Manuel Ochoa appear in the cast.
