= Antonio Cornejo Polar =

Peruvian-born academic, teacher and critic

Rector of San Marcos University
- In office 1985–1987
- Preceded by: Gastón Pons Muzzo
- Succeeded by: Jorge Campos Rey de Castro

Personal details
- Born: December 23, 1936 Arequipa, Peru
- Died: May 18, 1997 (aged 60) Lima, Peru
- Spouse: Cristina Soto
- Education: San Agustin University
- Profession: Professor
- Website: http://celacp.org

Antonio Cornejo Polar (December 23, 1936 – May 18, 1997) was a Peruvian-born academic, teacher, literature and cultural critic, known particularly for his theorization of the concept of "heterogeneity."

== Biography ==
Cornejo Polar was born December 23, 1936, in Arequipa, Peru. He received a PhD from the National University of San Agustin in Arequipa, became a professor there as well, then in 1966 he becomes Professor in National University of San Marcos, Lima. He was also a visiting professor at the University of Pittsburgh and UC Berkeley.

He authored 11 books, and was considered an authority on Latin American literature and culture. He was also the founder and editor of the Revista de Critica Literaria Latinoamericana, a journal which covered issues of culture and ideology in Latin-American literature.

Cornejo Polar was married to Cristina Soto, who worked with him on the journal and also managed "Latinoamericana Editores", a publishing company which covers Latin-American topics. They had four children: Ursula, Alvaro, Gonzalo and Rafael and four grandsons, Gonzalo, Juán Diego, Antonio and Natalia.

He died after a long illness on May 18, 1997, in Lima.

== Works ==
- Discurso en loor de la poesía: estudio y edición. (Lima: Universidad Nacional Mayor de San Marcos. 1964)
- Los universos narrativos de José María Arguedas. (Buenos Aires: Losada. 1974)
- La novela peruana: siete estudios (Lima: Horizonte. 1977)
- Literatura y sociedad en el Perú: la novela indigenista. (Lima: Lasontay. 1980)
- La cultura nacional, problema y posibilidad. (Lima: Lluvia. 1981)
- Sobre literatura y crítica latinoamericanas. (Caracas: Universidad Central de Venezuela. 1982)
- Vigencia y universalidad de José María Arguedas. (Lima: Horizonte. 1984)
- La formación de la tradición literaria en el Perú. (Lima: CEP. 1989)
- The multiple voices of Latin American literature. (Berkeley: University of California. 1994)
- Escribir en el aire. Ensayo sobre la heterogeneidad socio-cultural en las literaturas andinas. (Lima: Editorial Horizonte. 1994)
- Mestizaje e hibridez : los riesgos de las metáforas. (La Paz: Universidad Mayor de San Andrés. 1997)
