= José María Arguedas =

Peruvian writer (1911–1969)

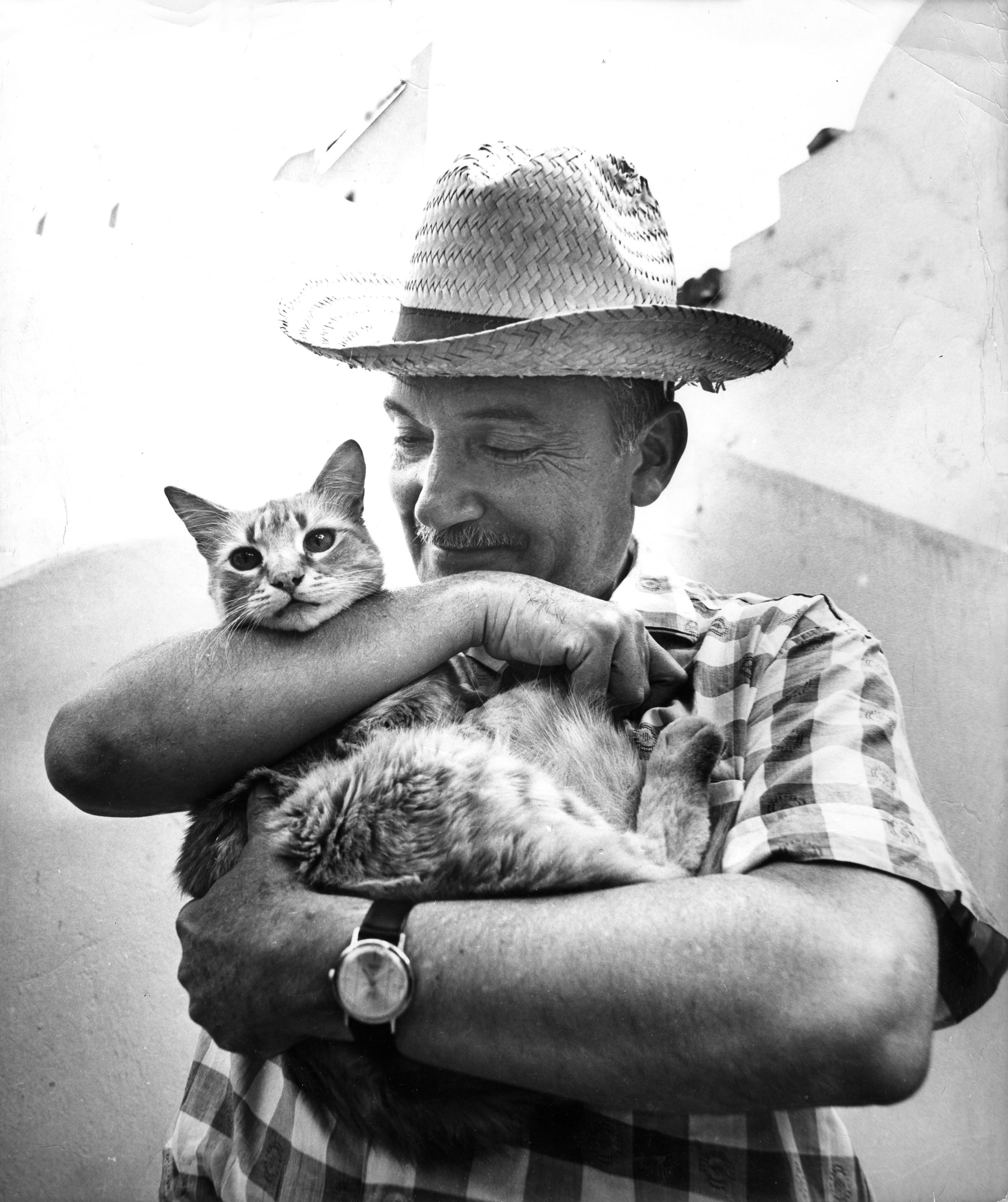
- Born: José María Arguedas Altamirano; January 18, 1911; Andahuaylas, Peru
- Died: December 2, 1969 (aged 58); Lima, Peru
- Resting place: Parque José María Arguedas, Andahuaylas
- Education: National University of San Marcos
- Occupations: Writer, poet, educator, anthropologist, ethnologist, journalist, translator
- Children: Vilma Victoria Arguedas Ponce
- Writing career
- Language: Quechua, Spanish
- Genres: Novel; short story; poetry; essay
- Notable works: Deep Rivers; Every Blood; The Fox From Up Above and the Fox From Down Below
- Movement: Indigenismo

José María Arguedas.

José María Arguedas Altamirano (Spanish pronunciation: [xoˈse maˈɾi(.a) aɾˈɣeðas], 18 January 1911 – 2 December 1969) was a Peruvian novelist, poet, and anthropologist. Arguedas was an author of mestizo descent who was fluent in the Quechua language. That fluency was gained by Arguedas's living in two Quechua households from the age of 7 to 11. First, he lived in the Indigenous servant quarters of his stepmother's home, then, escaping her "perverse and cruel" son, with an Indigenous family approved by his father. Arguedas wrote novels, short stories, and poems in both Spanish and Quechua.

Generally regarded as one of the most notable figures of 20th-century Peruvian literature, Arguedas is especially recognized for his intimate portrayals of Indigenous Andean culture. Key in his desire to depict Indigenous expression and perspective more authentically was his creation of a new idiom that blended Spanish and Quechua and premiered in his debut novel Yawar Fiesta.

Notwithstanding a dearth of translations into English, the critic Martin Seymour-Smith has dubbed Arguedas "the greatest novelist of our time," who wrote "some of the most powerful prose that the world has known."

== Early life and education ==
José Maria Arguedas was born on 18 January 1911 in Andahuaylas, a province in the southern Andes. He was born into a well-off family, but his mother died when he was two years old. Because of the absence of his father, a lawyer who traveled frequently, and his bad relationship with his step-mother and step-brother, he comforted himself in the care of the family's Indigenous servants, allowing him to immerse himself in the language and customs of the Andes, which came to form an important part of his personality. He went to primary school in San Juan de Lucana, Puquio, and Abancay, and completed his secondary studies in Ica, Huancayo, and Lima.

He began studying at National University of San Marcos (Lima) in 1931; there he graduated with a degree in literature. He later took up studies in Ethnology, receiving his degree in 1957 and his doctorate in 1963. Between 1937 and 1938 he was sent to El Sexto Prison for protesting an envoy sent to Peru by Italian dictator Benito Mussolini.

== Career ==
Arguedas also worked for the Ministry of Education, where he put into practice his interests in preserving and promoting Peruvian culture, in particular traditional Andean music and dance. He was the director of the Casa de la Cultura (1963) and of the National Museum of History (1964–1966). He championed the work of mate burilado artist Apolonia Dorregaray Veli.

In 1968, Arguedas was awarded the Inca Garcilaso de la Vega literary prize, where he gave his famous speech No soy un aculturado (I am not an acculturated man), which has been described by academic sources as a "powerful" embracing of his mixed heritage.

Arguedas' depression became a crisis in 1966, leading him to a first suicide attempt by overdose on April 11 of that year. After the suicide attempt, his life dramatically changed. To treat his illness, he contacted the Chilean psychiatrist Lola Hoffman, who recommended, as a treatment, that he continue writing. Following her instructions, he published another book of short stories "Amor Mundo" and worked on what would be his posthumous work: The Fox From Up Above and the Fox From Down Below.

On November 29, 1969, Arguedas locked himself in one of the university bathrooms and shot himself at the National Agrarian University in La Molina, leaving behind very specific instructions for his funeral, a diary depicting his depression, and the final unfinished manuscript of The Fox From Up Above and the Fox From Down Below.

This work includes portions of Arguedas's diary, memories of his distressing childhood, thoughts on Peruvian culture, and his reasons for suicide. He depicts his struggle between his desire to authentically illuminate the life of the Andean Indians and his personal anguish trapping him in depression:

But since I have not been able to write on the topics chosen and elaborated, whether small or ambitious, I am going to write on the only one that attracts me--this one of how I did not succeed in killing myself and how I am now wracking my brains looking for a way to liquidate myself decently..."

The title of the book originates in a Quechua myth that Arguedas translated into Spanish earlier in his life. “El zorro de arriba y el zorro de abajo” refers to the Quechua symbols for life and death, and modernity and tradition.

== Literary career ==
Arguedas began his literary career by writing short stories about the Indigenous environment familiar to him from his childhood. He wrote in a Spanish highly influenced by Quechua syntax and vocabulary.

By the time he published his first novel in 1941, Yawar Fiesta ("Blood Fest"), he had begun to explore the theme that would interest him for the rest of his career: the clash between Western "civilization" and the Indigenous "traditional" way of life. He was thus considered part of the indigenista movement in South American literature, and continued to explore this theme in his next two books Los ríos profundos ("Deep Rivers," 1958) and Todas las Sangres ("All the Bloods," 1964). Yet he also was conscious of the simplistic portrayal of the Indigenous peoples in other "indigenista" literature and worked hard to give the Andean Indians a true voice in his works. This effort was not always successful as some critics contend that Arguedas portrayed Indian characters as too gentle and childlike. Another theme in Arguedas' writing is the struggle of mestizos of Indian-Spanish descent and their navigation between the two seemingly separate parts of their identity. Many of his works also depicted the violence and exploitation of race relations in Peru's small rural towns and haciendas.

Arguedas was moderately optimistic about the possibility of a rapprochement between the forces of "tradition" and the forces of "modernity" until the 1960s when he became more pessimistic. In his last (unfinished) work, El zorro de arriba y el zorro de abajo ("The Fox From Up Above and the Fox From Down Below," 1969), he abandoned the realism of his earlier works for a more postmodern approach. This novel expressed his despair, caused by his fear that the "primitive" ways of the Indians could not survive the onslaught of modern technology and capitalism. At the same time that Arguedas was becoming more pessimistic about race relations in his country, younger Peruvian intellectuals became increasingly militant, often criticizing his work in harsh terms for his poetic, romanticized treatment of Indigenous and rural life. An instance of the debate that ensued can be seen in the famous "Mesa redonda sobre Todas las sangres" ("Roundtable on Todas las sangres") of 1965, in which Arguedas's penultimate novel was the object of blunt criticism from several social scientists at the Instituto de Estudios Peruanos.

== Bibliography ==
=== Fiction ===
- 1935 – Agua. Los escoleros. Warma kuyay. Collection of short stories.
- 1941 – Yawar Fiesta ("Blood Festival"). Novel. Revised in 1958. English translation: Yawar Fiesta, translated by Frances Horning Barraclough (University of Texas Press, 1985).
- 1954 – Diamantes y pedernales. Novel.
- 1958 – Los ríos profundos. Novel. English translation: Deep Rivers, translated by Frances Horning Barraclough (University of Texas Press, 1978).
- 1961 - El Sexto. Novel, based on Arguedas's experiences in the federal prison El Sexto in 1938.
- 1964 - Todas las Sangres. Novel.
- 1965 - El sueño del pongo: Cuento quechua. Pongoq mosqoynin; qatqa runapa willakusqan. Bilingual (Quechua/Spanish) story, published as a pamphlet.
- 1967 – Amor mundo y todos los cuentos. Collection of short stories.
- 1971 – El zorro de arriba y el zorro de abajo. Unfinished novel, published posthumously. Describes the crises that would lead to his suicide. English translation: The Fox From Up Above and the Fox From Down Below, translated by Frances Horning Barraclough (University of Pittsburgh Press, 2000).
- 1973 – Cuentos olvidados. Posthumous collection of short stories.

=== Poetry ===
Arguedas wrote his poems in Quechua and later translated them into Spanish.

- 1962 – Túpac Amaru Kamaq taytanchisman. Haylli-taki. A nuestro padre creador Túpac Amaru.
- 1966 – Oda al jet.
- 1969 – Qollana Vietnam Llaqtaman / Al pueblo excelso de Vietnam.
- 1972 – Katatay y otros poemas. Huc jayllikunapas. Published posthumously in a bilingual edition (Quechua and Spanish) by Sybila Arredondo de Arguedas.

=== Anthropology and folkloric studies ===
- 1938 – Canto kechwa. Includes an essay on the artistic and creative abilities of Indians and mestizos. Bilingual edition (Quechua and Spanish), compiled while Arguedas was imprisoned for participating in a student protest.
- 1947 – Mitos, leyendas y cuentos peruanos. Quechua myths, legends, and tales, collected by school teachers in the Andes, edited and translated into Spanish by Arguedas and Francisco Izquierdo Ríos.
- 1949 – Canciones y cuentos del pueblo quechua. Published in English translation as The Singing Mountaineers: Songs and Tales of the Quechua People, edited by Ruth Stephan (University of Texas Press, 1957).
- 1953 – Cuentos mágico-realistas y canciones de fiestas tradicionales - Folclor del valle del Mantaro.
- 1956 – Puquio, una cultura en proceso de cambio.
- 1957 – Estudio etnográfico de la feria de Huancayo.
- 1956 – Junior y sus dos serranos.
- 1957 – Evolución de las comunidades indígenas.
- 1958 – El arte popular religioso y la cultura mestiza.
- 1961 – Cuentos mágico-religiosos quechuas de Lucanamarca.
- 1966 – Poesía quechua.
- 1968 – Las comunidades de España y del Perú.
- 1975 – Señores e indios: Acerca de la cultura quechua. Posthumous collection, edited by Ángel Rama.
- 1976 – Formación de una cultura nacional indoamericana. Posthumous collection, edited by Ángel Rama.

== Legacy ==
=== Awards ===
- 1958. National Culture Promotion Award Javier Prado for his specialty thesis in Ethnology, "The Evolution of Indigenous Communities".
- The José María Arguedas Narrative Prize, awarded since 2000 by Casa de las Américas to promote the narrative work of Latin American writers.

=== Centenary of His Birth ===
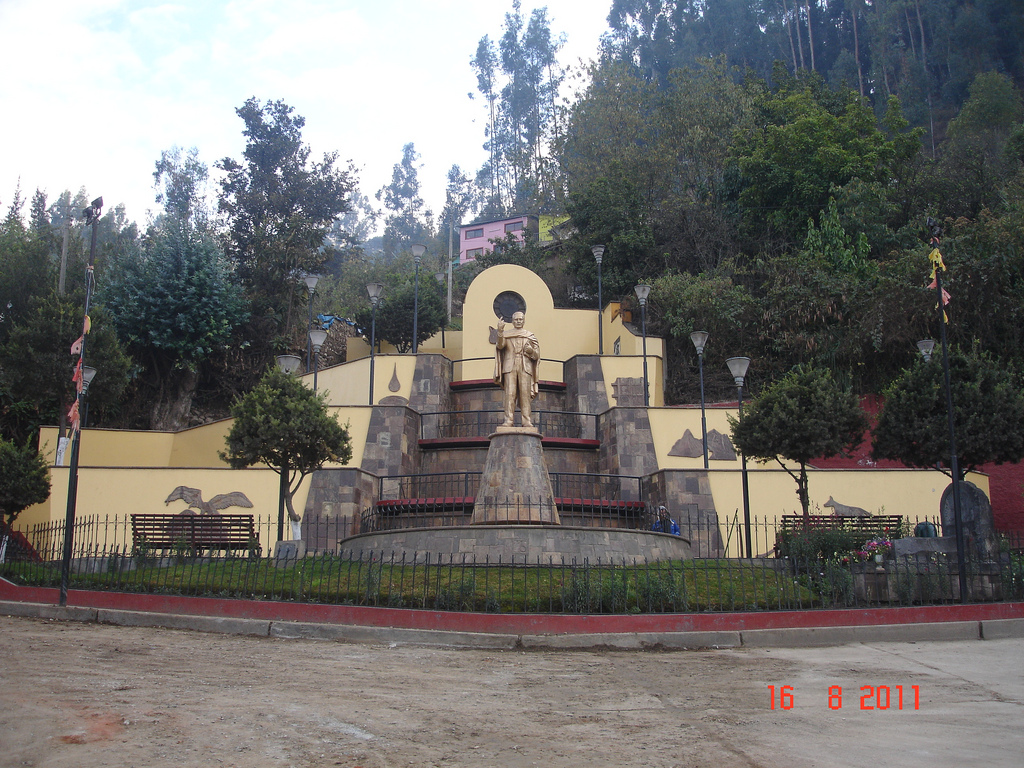
Mausoleum of ethnologist José María Arguedas in Andahuaylas.

In 2011, on the occasion of the centenary of José María Arguedas's birth, various activities were planned in honor of the indigenist novelist. The first of these was the proposal for the Government of Peru to declare 2011 as the "Year of the Centenary of the Birth of José María Arguedas". However, this was set aside, and on December 31, 2010, President Alan García declared 2011 as the "Year of the Centenary of Machu Picchu for the World," also commemorating the centenary of the rediscovery of the Inca citadel in 2011. This decision sparked controversy, as many believed it was unfair not to dedicate the year to one of Peru's greatest scholars.

On his centenary, January 18, 2011, various activities were held in his honor. In Lima, a parade organized by the Catholic University Theater (TUC) started from the Congress of the Republic, down Abancay Avenue, to the Parque Universitario, featuring floats, stilt walkers, and typical characters from Arguedas's literature. An artistic performance followed, incorporating texts, testimonies, poems, excerpts from his works, and figures like the "Zorro de Arriba" and the "Zorro de Abajo", using masks and a large cast of actors. The event continued at the historic Casona of the National University of San Marcos, where the Minister of Culture inaugurated the exhibition "Arguedas and Popular Art".

In Andahuaylas, Apurímac, more than 5,000 people paraded through the city from seven in the morning, accompanied by folk dances and the scissors dance. The celebration began with a Quechua mass at 7:00 a.m. in the Church of San Pedro, followed by the ringing of bells.

In Bermillo de Sayago—the town that served as a study site for his doctoral thesis "The Communities of Spain and Peru"—a tribute was held under the slogan "Peru in the 'Sayaguese Soul', Bermillo de Sayago, 1958, in the Light of Arguedas".

=== Banknote ===
In July 2022, a new 20 sol banknote featuring a photograph of José María Arguedas taken by artist Baldomero Pestana was issued. The issuance was controversial because the BCRP did not seek permission from the photographer to use the image.

== See also ==
- Peruvian literature
- List of Peruvian writers

== Sources ==
- Aibar Ray, Elena .Identidad y resistencia cultural en las obras de José María Arguedas. (1992) Pontificia Universidad Católica del Perú.
- Cornejo Polar, Antonio. Los universos narrativos de José María Arguedas. (1997) Editorial Horizonte.
- Franco, Sergio R. (editor). José María Arguedas: hacia una poética migrante. (2006) Instituto Internacional de Literatura Iberoamericana. ISBN 1-930744-22-6
- García-Bedoya Maguiña, C.. La recepción de la obra de José María Arguedas. Reflexiones preliminares. Letras (Lima), 82(117), 2011, p. 83-93. https://doi.org/10.30920/letras.82.117.5
- Kapsoli, Wilfredo (compliador), Zorros al fin del milenio: actas y ensayos del seminario sobre la última novela de José María Arguedas. (2004) Universidad Ricardo Palma/Centro de Investigación. ISBN 9972-885-75-5
- Llano, Aymará de. Pasión y agonía: la escritura de José María de Arguedas. (2004) Centro de Estudios Literarios 'Antonio Cornejo Polar'/Editorial Martin. ISBN 0-9747750-1-0
- Moore, Melisa. En las encruciadas: Las ciencias sociales y la novela en el Perú. (2003) Fondo Editorial Universiad Nacional Mayor de San Marcos. ISBN 9972-46-211-0
- Muñoz, Silverio. José María Arguedas y el mito de la salvación por la cultura. (1987) Editorial Horizonte.
- Portugal, José Alberto. Las novelas de José María Arguedas: Una incursión en lo inarticulado. (2007) Editorial Fondo PUCP. ISBN 978-9972-42-801-2
- Sales, Dora (ed.) (2009) José María Arguedas. Qepa wiñaq... Siempre. Literatura y antropología. Prólogo de Sybila de Arguedas. Edición crítica de Dora Sales. Madrid/Frankfurt: Iberoamericana/Vervuert. Colección “El Fuego Nuevo. Textos Recobrados”. ISBN 978-84-8489-433-9 (Iberoamericana); 978-3-86527-490-8 (Vervuert)
- Sandoval, Ciro A. and Sandra M. Boschetto-Sandoval (eds), Jose Maria Arguedas. (1998) Ohio University Press. ISBN 0-89680-200-0
- Vargas Llosa, Mario. La Utopia Arcaica: Jose Maria Arguedas y Las Ficciones del Indigenismo. (1997) Fonode Cultura Económica.
