= Peruvian retablo =

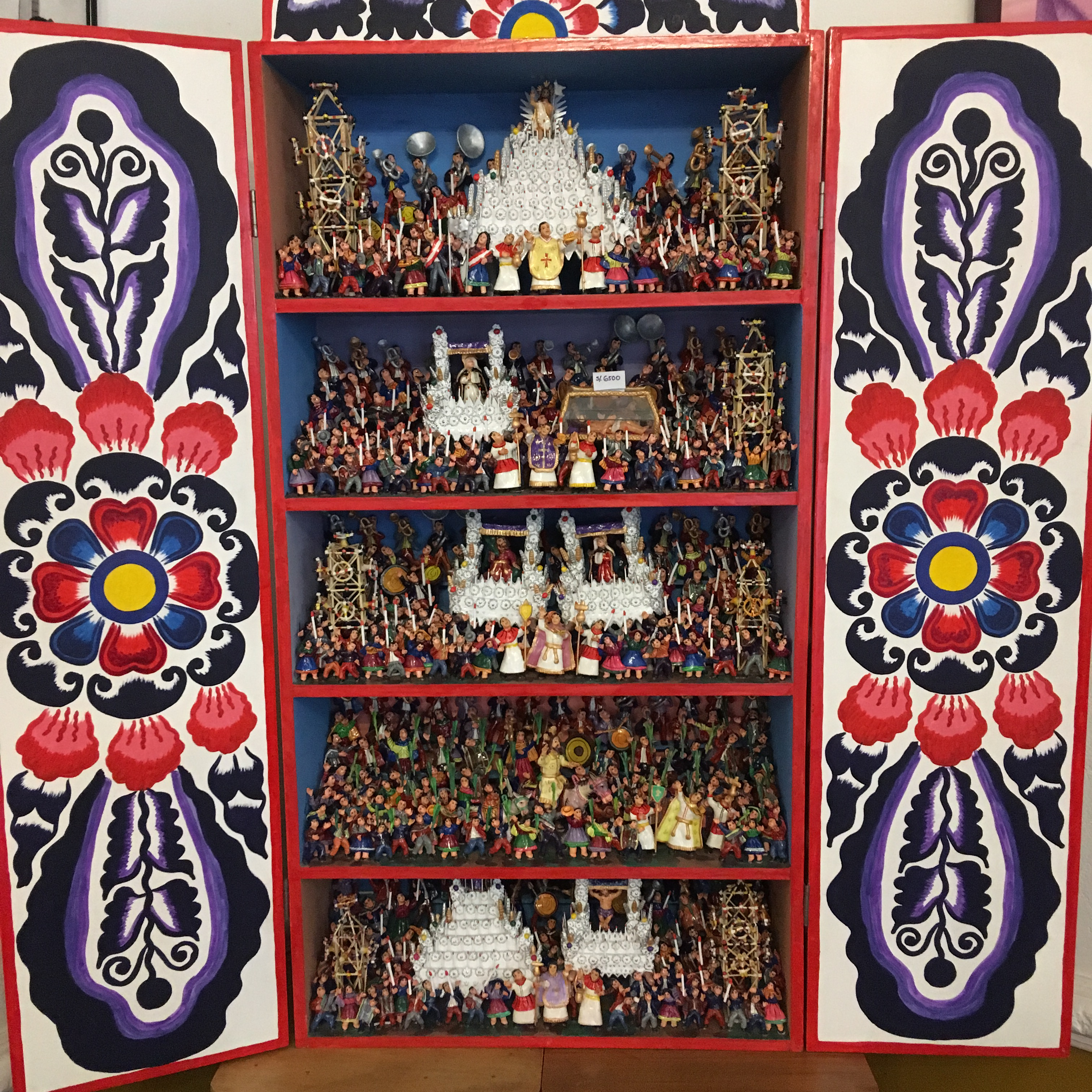
A retablo ayacuchano

A Peruvian retablo, in the context of Peruvian folk art, is a home altar with figures of saints or religious scenes, arranged on shelves inside a portable box altar, made to be shuttered closed with hinged doors to protect the content.

It is also called retablo ayacuchano in Spanish-language scholarship, referring to its origins in the Ayacucho region of the Central Peruvian highlands, though it is now manufactured in the peripheral departments or elsewhere in Peru.

== Terminology ==
The original Spanish word retablo (cognate of "retable") has a rather different meaning, and denotes some sort of structure to house an image behind the altar table, deriving from Latin retrotabulum. Such a piece in a church is better termed an altarpiece if it features a panel painting, and reredos if consisting of sculptures or relief. But in the context of the folk art of the Americas, it carries a different meaning, (Note: Thus retablo refers to painted panels in the art of New Mexico. Whereas painted panels from Sarhua District, Ayacucho are referred to as Tablas de Sarhua) and "in Peruvian usage, has also come to mean a whole set of differentiated objects".

Thus "Peruvian retablo" refers to a "portable altar", populated with figures of saints or other people, animals, beings, and objects, and English-language literature mainly discuss the works of Peruvian-born émigrés based in the U.S. as their craftsmen. However, the "retablo ayacuchano" is the shorthand used for this genre of artwork in Spanish-language literature.

The product still being created into the 1940s was generically called San Marcos Box (cajón San Marcos), until collector and art dealer Alicia Bustamante decided to start calling them "retablo".

Ignacio López Quispe (son of master Joaquín López Antay), stated c. 1979 that the term sculptor (escultor) was still used as the term for the artist in Ayacucho, but he had been called one of the retableros in 1977, and later they came up with the term retablista. But in the former days, a makers of sanmarcos (mostly saint type retablos) was referred to as a santero, pintore ("painter") or escultore ("sculptor").

== Origins and history ==
It is generally conceded that the retablo of this style originated in the Ayacucho region, more particularly around Ayacucho city and its Huamanga province, though artists in other parts of Peru now create them. It has been dubbed by some as retablo ayacuchano. but it is implicit the manufacture of a "retablo ayacuchano" could occur in the departments of Huancavelica (to the west), Apurímac (to the east), and parts of Arequipa (to the south).

There are both church and indigenous traits in the artwork and composition (Christian good vs. evil and Andean three world or pachas concept), and ultimately can be traced back to both Spanish and pre-Columbian origins. The illa was a portable, sacred piece of rock (struck by lightning) which could crafted to hold offerings, and transported to the huaca.

The precursors of the retablo ayacuchano bore such names as misa, demanda, missa mastay or cajón San Marcos ("St. Mark's box or drawer"). Although the "St. Mark's box" name has been used as shorthand to denote all the precursors, the name used in Colonial times was the demanda, carried by itinerant priests and doctrineros. The priests may have initially brought the prop from Spain, perhaps using the portable shrines or "boxes" (cajas) of the santero, a person who solicits alms in the name of a saint. (Confusingly santero is also one of the obsolete names for a retablo (sanmarco) maker. (Note: The profession santero is applied to López Antay)

But the oldest (homespun) Peruvian portable shrines contained cult idols carved on a piece of piedra de Huamanga (type of alabaster (Note: aka Niño Rumi.)), placed in an altar box, (Note: Majluf & Wuffarden (1998), Fig. 193 is a Retablo de la Virgen, first half of 19th cent., maguey (agave) and paste) or so it is contended. But images of the virgin molded from the fiber of maguey (agave) is known from the 17th century, made in the Southern end of Peru. (Note: Peruvian Altiplano, Strong (2012), p. 197, citing Phipps 2004, p. 261.) The portable altars that traveled with the proselytizers would typically depict the Virgin, surrounded by the images of saints and smaller images of the Virgin in stages of her life; the altar would be no taller than three feet; the Christian missionary would pack an altar or two on an ass or a mule and go from place to place. (Note: Strong (2012), p. 197, where she calls the altar retablo.) It is noted in this connection that in the age when loaded caravans of mules were the means of commerce between regions, Ayacucho served as the hub going from Lima to inland.

The missionaries had abandoned using these altars by the end of the 18th century, and the props fell into the hands of people called the demanderos, but this came to be employed as cause for celebration, dance, drunkenness, which degenerated even to violence (though alms were being paid), and the municipality of Lima in 1831 moved to revoke their permit.

The cajón San Marcos '(cf. § San Marcos Box below) apparently started in the 19th century might be considered the most immediate precursor of the modern retablo ayacuchano. The cajón San Marcos is an object that remains a popular crafted and merchandised genre of folk art to this day, while other crafts (Note: i.e., the alabaster carvings, silver filigrees, saddles.) have languished. Some scholar choose to refer to the San Marcos Box as a classic form of retablo, even though retablo was a tag that wasn't applied to the artwork until the 1940s by curator Bustamante, as aforementioned.

It was master maker Joaquín López Antay whom Bustamante had discovered as early as 1940–1943 or as late as 1949. (Note: The years are conflicting. Cabel García (2018), p. 112 gives an early 1940s dating and the 1940–1943 range in footnote, citing Fujii (1998), whose source in turn is clearly Arguedas (1958), but there appear to be two different prints of this, one that says "Fue ya en 1943", p. 148 and another "Fue ya en 1949", p. 147. And Fujii (2005), p. 220 provides the 1949 date noting she commissioned her first retablo from him the same year, citing Arguedas (1958), p. 147.) (Note: Bustamante had visited the city of Ayacucho in 1937 to find material for an international art exhibit, but on that occasion she did not see any retablos.) Bustamante helped groom the style incorporating European art influence, and it is López Antay sometimes billed as the "father of retablo ayacuchano". López is certainly the only one distinguished with the National Culture Award, and one of three masters most discussed in literature, the others being Florentino Jiménez Toma (father of Nicario Jiménez Quispe, cf. section below) and Jesús Urbano Rojas. Several members of the Jiménez family are engaged in the retablo-making trade, going back to Nicario's great-grandfather according to them.

== Make and materials ==
These Peruvian retablo are made portable, equipped with hinged doors to protect the contents. Traditionally, the maguey (agave) was used as source material, its mashed pulp could be molded to make the figurines, and it could be split into planks from which the boxes were made.

Other sources say in vintage San Marco Boxes, the saint figures were alabaster carvings using piedra de Huamanga also called niño-rumi in Quechua, meaning 'baby rock'. (Note: The quality of the sanmarcos alabasters seeems to have been of broad range. An example of a rude carving in relief of a mounted figure (early 20the cent.) is compared to intricately carved figures (1920)) It has been noted alabaster carving used to be a once thriving craft industry unto its own.

The modern retablo ayacuchano figures have been made of a paste made from mashed boiled potatoes, with plaster or gypsum powder added. (Note: Originally only the kneaded boiled potato paste was used, and the plaster added later, according to Fujii.) (Note: Others write that paper and potato flour were the ingredients.) A "blue potato from Huanta", peculiarly favored by master Jesús Urbano, got boiled, ground, mixed with gypsum into a dough of desired consistency, then painted.

Classic San Marco figurines were painted using aniline (aniline black), cut with glue for glossy look, to draw the lines, plus variously colored natural dyes like cochineal. The red bordering on a San Marcos was symbolic of the blood of livestock, and the flora-based decoration symbolic of the power of nature, from what Fujii had heard. San Marcos are capped by a triangular crown, symbolizing the mountain god (wamani).

== San Marcos Box ==
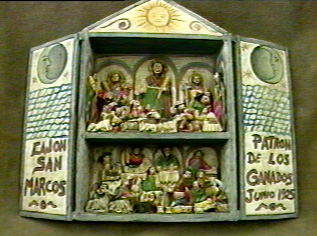
A retablo with St. Mark, patron of animals

The classic retablos of St. Mark or San Marcos Box (cajón San Marcos, also styled just "sanmarcos") (Note: Rendered variously as "San Marcos Box", "San Marcos retablo" sanmarco[s], or "St. Mark's Box", "St. Mark Box";) was a portable boxed altar for livestock rituals.

The box-making tradition recognized the evangelist St. Mark as a patron saint of sheep and cattle husbandry, thus closely associated with herding. The retablo in the past days were crafted for the private ownership of herdsmen and merchants, and the box was placed on a ceremonial table (mesa) to be present for the rituals involving farm animals. Other saints are associated with animals among scholars of Peruvian art: John the Baptist with sheep, Saint Agnes with goats, Saint Anthony with horses.

Whoever the specific saint was, the name cajón San Marcos was the generic term that was used (though St. Anthony's box could be a "sanantonio", or one might refer to a sanmaros-sanlucas); that is, until Bustamante decided to label them as retablos in the 1940s (cf. § Joaquín López Antay for precise dating).

There are typically two levels or floors on the San Marcos, with top level occupied by the main saint in the center, so that the lower level can depict other scenes such as the herraza ritual.

One old name for a San Marcos Box was misa, having to do with the Catholic mass. (Note: But the name misa was rather confusing, since a mesa ritual (ritual table) would also be present in the rituals.) Perhaps not so old, since according to Edilberto Jiménez (artist, 1966) the box was called missa in towns he is familiar with. Depending on the livestock type, it would be called vaca-missa if for a cowherd, missa-oveja for a shepherd, missa-cabra for a goatherd, or whatever animal the client specifies it is for when asked, and mounts the appropriate saint accordingly (or customized according to customer order).

It was the ritual of cattle branding (herranzas) and also the healing ceremony of the mountain god wamani that called for the presence of the San Marcos Box. The herranza ritual involves not just adorning the livestock's ear with colored ribbons, but clipping a piece of ear and the end of the tail and these would be placed on the ritual table near (underneath) the Box, until the buried as offerings to the deities, alongside chicha, coca, etc.

== Adam and Eve ==
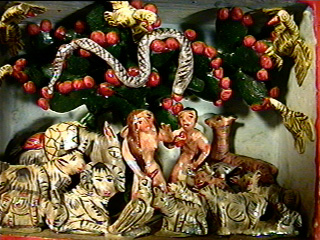
Adam and Eve

There is a story of how a Catholic priest effectively used a retablo to hold the attention of his Indigenous audience. He began with a closed retablo, and told a long story about what was hidden inside: a naked man meets naked woman, the serpent, temptation, and punishment. Then he would open the box and reveal the figures, disclosing the story to be about Adam and Eve.

== Daily life and identity ==
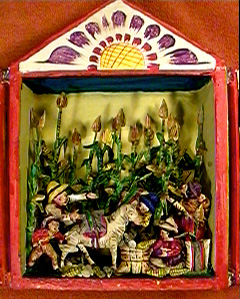
Corn harvest

Later, retablos evolved to include daily scenes in the lives of the Andean people, such as harvests, processions, feasts, and tableaux depicting shops and homes.

In the period from the 1940s onwards, retablistas began to introduce slice of life scenes and elements of the indigenous people of the Andean region. The works of this style being dubbed "retablos costumbristas" (after the costumbrismo school of artistic movement). The reason López Antay started making items that was as strictly traditional was that his clientele crave some sort of novelty on new themes while still demanding authenticity.

The master maker Florentino Jiménez stated in retrospect in 2001 that he and sons were the first to start using reeds or canes to make the retablos, which were meant for quantity over quality, and also matchbox sized ones, but inserting the everyday scene paintings (cuadros costumbristas). These were copied by the others. These diverse media experiments, also using eggshells, gourds, toqto (clay toasters for grain) etc. but it is again emphasized that these did not always produce aesthetically successful results.

== Joaquín López Antay ==
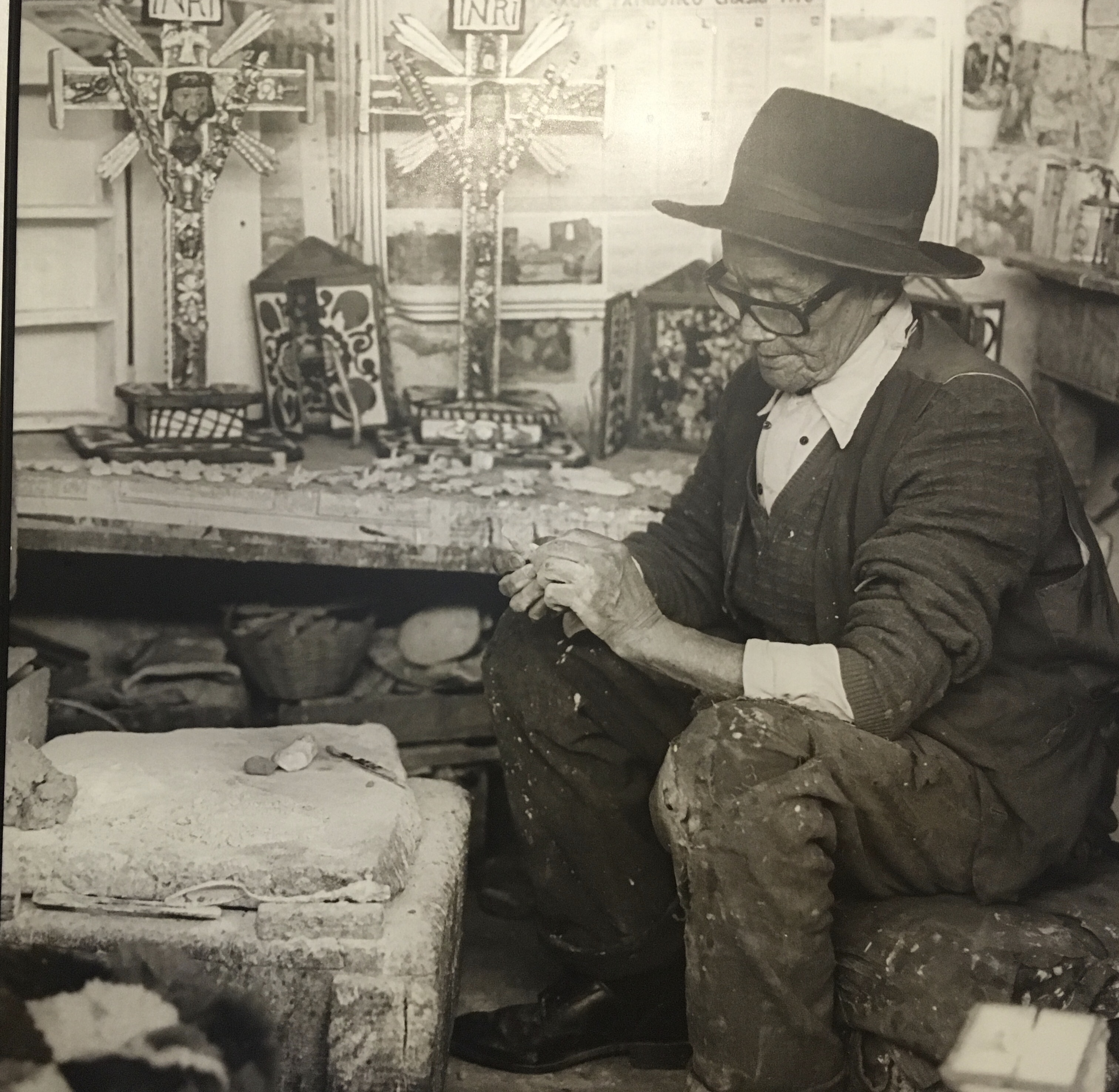
Joaquín López Antay in workshop (Note: There is a portrait painting of López Antay by Enrique Camino Brent (d. 1960).)

Joaquín López Antay is considered by some the first retablista, and one of the preeminent masters, decorated with the Culture Prize in 1975, as aforementioned.

López Antay's San Marco boxes (billed as "retablos"), would feature scenes incorporating indigenous culture, in what was part of the indigenista movement. The artist incorporated such scenes as suggested by his clientele circle: the collector Bustamunte, her brother-in-law anthropologist-novelist José María Arguedas, and painter José Sabogal Diéguez who were strongly influencing and help shaping the emerging retablo style. There is thus the image of marketplace-driven art. Using Huancavelica jail as backdrop for a passion scene was purportedly suggested by the painter Sabogal, but López himself recalls such piece as verbally requested by Bustamunte; the bullfight was another request; he also made threshing scenes, cockfighting, and tuna gathering scenes that entered her collection. (Note: López, in interview by Razzeto, Mario (1982). Quoted in Ulfe (2011), pp. 57–58, Cabel García (2018), p. 113, excerpted RPP.)

As for the composition of López Antay's San Marco Box or retablo, the lower level could feature a wide range of scenery from the lives of the indigenous people, from animal herding, to crop harvest, dance, cockfight, etc., as already touched upon earlier. Further artistic analysis explains that in López Antay's new style, the left half was reserved for human suffering scenes dubbed the "passion" (pasión), and the right half for happy scenes dubbed "reunion" (reunión). (Note: This right-left presentation may derive from the European style of presentation (perhaps like a diptych), probably influenced by Bustamante.) In the analysis of a particular San Marco retablo by Arguedas, the passion half shows an indigenous peasant flogged by a mestizo overseer, and the "reunion" half people enjoying dance and music. The condor in the middle symbolizes the wamani mountain god or by extension, the indigenous people's resolve and spiritual invincibility despite the social difficulties. The characterization from the opposite camp, critic Jürgen Golte (Note: Golte is an aficionado of Edilberto Jiménez, and the opinion comes from his own essay on Edilberto in his own co-edited anthology on Edilberto.), wrote that an indigenous emblem such as the condor representing wamani (which Golte claims foreign buyers cared nothing about) was López Antay's way of asserting his own artistic expression in otherwise commission-ordered art. (Note: Golte, p. 23 apud Cabel García (2018), p. 112)

== Jiménez family ==
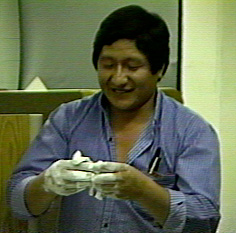
Nicario Jiménez Quispe in workshop

Florentino also credits his family for pioneering the giant-sized retablo, such as the one commemorating the Battle of Ayacucho in the Peruvian War of Independence.

The story goes that Florentino Jiménez was making San Marcos on barter (or paltry sums) while residing in Alcamenca, Department of Ayacucho (Note: His eldest son Nicario born (1957) was a newborn infant when he made a distant trip on foot to Sacsamarca District where there was an affluent shepherding community, where he was able to (sell his sanmarcos and) gain a number of livestock. Nicolo fell sick and received a healing from a curandero.) and it wasn't until he moved to Huamanga (in 1968 or 1969) that he learned the sanmarcos were being called retablos and being sold for real money.

Florentino's eldest son Nicario Jiménez was born 1957 in a village in Alcamenca, near Ayacucho city. The artist has produced traditional pieces in the past, but has shifted his emphasis to innovative unique themes, such as cityscapes of New York or Miami. He also features culturally iconic items familiar to Peruvians such as the coca leaf in a crucifix piece, or the pet and cuisine ingredient guinea pig (cuy) in a shaman retablo. His Pishtaco (Pistaku) scenes, while part of traditional Peruvian lore, is not standard theme for a devotional retablo.

Florentino's third son Edilberto Jiménez (Note: Hosono (2005) wrote that unlike his siblings, he does not constantly produce artwork, and insists on still residing in Ayacucho city. But now he lives in Lima.) has produced an acclaimed work entitled Sueño de la mujer huamanguina en los ocho años de la violencia ("The Dream of the Woman from Huamanga in the eight years of violence", 1988). Here, the woman's husband accused by soldiers of Shining Path involvement is attacked, jailed, killed, and the body is eaten by dogs; the overwatching Christian God and the mountain god sympathize and salvages his soul. Gold gleams in the mountain god's cavern, but under the sleeping mother and child the blood flows. A replica of this work was commissioned in 2017 by the Museum of International Folk Art of Santa Fe, New Mexico.

== Comisión de la Verdad y Reconciliación ==
On 29 August 2003, the Comisión de la Verdad y Reconciliación (CVR, Truth and Reconciliation Commission) announced its findings regarding the Internal conflict in Peru in the public square of Huamanga, Ayacucho. Of the 70,000 death toll in the bloodshed, 40% were from the department of Ayacucho. A giant two-storey retablo with the doors flying open was built to serve as stage for this announcement. (Note: The report blamed the Sindero Luminoso responsible for 46% of the deaths and disappearances, the Peruvian army 30%, and other factions (including MRTA) and reasons 24%.)

== Gallery ==
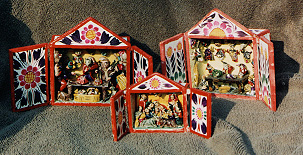
Three retablos

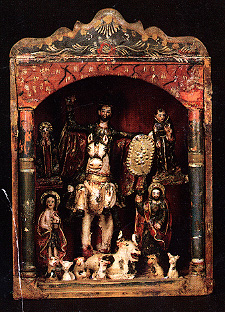
Santiago (St James)

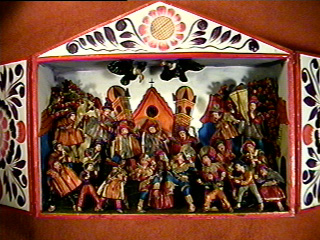
Retablo with Ayacucho, Peru as theme

== See also ==
- Diorama
- Nativity scene
