= Gastón Pons Muzzo =

Peruvian chemist

Gastón Pons Muzzo (circa 1922 – January 6, 2004) was a Peruvian chemist.

He was born in Tacna, Peru and joined National University of San Marcos staff in the 1960s to lecture general chemistry laboratory at the Department of Chemistry. He also was known for his teaching of physical chemistry and for his accompanying textbook. He was elected as dean in 1964 and remained in office until 1967.

He was elected as president of Chemical Society of Peru between 1974 and 1977 and was rector magnificus of the university. In 1985, when his term ended, he was awarded by then Peru's official secretary of treasury, Miguel Ángel Cusiánovich, in recognition of his role as rector.

Before his retirement from National University of San Marcos, he was appointed to another term in Peru's chemical society from 1988 to 1989. During the late 1990s, he was elected president of the commission which eventually established "María Inmaculada de Magdalena University", but health problems led him retire.

He died on January 6, 2004, in Lima, Peru at the age of 81.

== Publications ==
- Physicochemistry (1st edition, 1969; 6th edition: Editorial Universo, Lima, 1985), university course.
- General chemistry. SI version (Editorial Bruño, Lima, 1987).
- 285 solved problems of General Chemistry. SI version (Asociación Editorial Stella, Lima, 1992), complement to the previous work.
- Chemistry-Physics Treatise (2000).

== External links [ edit code · edit ] ==
- Prof. Dr. HC Gastón Pons Muzzo (1922-2004)
- Page of the National University of San Marcos
