= Manuel Quispe =

Manuel Quispe was a Q'ero elder and medicine man. He died on December 11, 2004, in Chua Chua.

Quispe was a mentor to many people] and taught them shamanic knowledge and rites, and the kuraq akulliq ("major coca chewer"), the Andean Shamanic degrees.
