= Editorial Losada =

Argentine publishing house founded in 1938

Editorial Losada is a traditional Argentine publishing house founded in 1938. The house has published important writers such as Nobel Prize winners Pablo Neruda and Miguel Ángel Asturias. Editorial Losada became a forum for Spanish republican thought, where all the literary work of the Generation of '27 was published, much of it for the first time in America. His catalog was, for a time, prohibited in Spain.

== Sources ==
- "La editorial Losada inicia nueva etapa en España". El Mundo (in Spanish).
