= Katherine Singer Kovács Prize =

Literary prize

Katherine Singer Kovacs Prize is a literary prize awarded annually in honour of Katherine Singer Kovács to any book that is published in English or Spanish in the field of Latin American and Spanish literatures and cultures. The prize was established in 1989 with a monetary gift from Joseph and Mimi B. Singer, who were the parents of Kovacs. Kovacs was a specialist in Spanish and Latin American literature and film. The awarding of the prize is managed by a Prize Selection Committee of the Modern Language Association.

== Katherine Singer Kovacs Prize Winners ==
Year	Author	Title	Publisher, date	Refs
1989	Roberto González Echevarría	Myth and archive: a theory of Latin American narrative	Cambridge Univ. Press, 1990	
1990	Regina Harrison	Signs, Songs, and Memory in the Andes: Translating Quechua Language and Culture	University of Texas Press,1989	
1991	George Mariscal	Contradictory Subjects Quevedo, Cervantes, and Seventeenth-Century Spanish Culture	Cornell University Press, 1991	
1991	William Rowe, Vivian Schelling	Memory and Modernity: Popular Culture in Latin America	Verso Books, 1991	
1992	Antonio Benítez-Rojo	The Repeating Island: The Caribbean and the Postmodern Perspective	Duke University Press, 1992	
1992	Francine Masiello	Between Civilization and Barbarism: Women, Nation, and Literary Culture in Modern Argentina	University of Nebraska Press, 1992	
1993	Margarita Zamora	Reading Columbus	University of California Press, 1993	
1994	Candace Slater	Dance of the Dolphin: Transformation and Disenchantment in the Amazonian Imagination	University of Chicago Press, 1994	
1995	Walter D. Mignolo	The Darker Side of the Renaissance: Literacy, Territoriality, and Colonization	University of Michigan Press, 1995	
1996	Diana Sorensen	Facundo and the Construction of Argentine Culture	University of Texas Press, 1996	
1997	Kathryn Joy McKnight	The Mystic of Tunja: The Writings of Madre Castillo, 1671–1742	University of Massachusetts Press, 1997	
1998	Frances Aparicio	Listening to Salsa: Gender, Latin Popular Music, and Puerto Rican Cultures	Wesleyan University Press, 1997	
1998	Rebecca Haidt	Embodying Enlightenment: Knowing the Body in Eighteenth-Century Spanish Literature and Culture	St. Martin's Press, 1998	
1999	Idelber Avelar	The untimely present	Duke University Press, 1999	
2000	Catherine Julien	Reading Inca history	University of Iowa press, 2000	
2001	Georgina Dopico Black	Perfect wives, other women	Duke Univ. Press, 2001	
2001	Francine R. Masiello	The Art of Transition: Latin American Culture and Neoliberal Crisis	Duke University Press, 2001	
2002	Noël Valis	The Culture of Cursilería: Bad Taste, Kitsch, and Class in Modern Spain	Duke University Press, 2003	
2003	Diana Taylor	The archive and the repertoire	Duke University Press, 2003	
2004	Sibylle Fischer	Modernity disavowed	Duke University Press, 2004	
2005	Rubén Gallo	Mexican modernity: The avant-garde and the technological revolution	MIT Press, 2005	
2006	William P. Childers	Transnational Cervantes	University of Toronto Press, 2006	
2007	Rolena Adorno	The polemics of possession in Spanish American narrative	Yale University Press, 2008	
2008	Nicolás Wey Gómez	The tropics of empire: Why Columbus sailed south to the Indies	MIT Press, 2008	
2009	Lisa Voigt	Writing captivity in the early modern Atlantic	University of North Carolina Press, 2009	
2010	Stephanie Merrim	The spectacular city, Mexico, and colonial Hispanic literary culture	University of Texas Press, 2010	
2011	E. Michael Gerli	Celestina and the Ends of Desire	University of Toronto Press, 2010	
2012	Joanne Rappaport; Tom Cummins	Beyond the Lettered City	Duke University Press, 2012	
2013	Mabel Moraña	Arguedas/Vargas Llosa: Dilemas y ensamblajes	Palgrave Macmillan, 2013	
2014	Stephanie Sieburth	Survival Songs: Conchita Piquer’s Coplas and Franco’s Regime of Terror	University of Toronto Press, 2014	
2015	Enrique Fernández	Anxieties of interiority and dissection in early modern Spain	University of Toronto Press, 2015	
2015	Anne Lambright	Andean Truths: Transitional Justice, Ethnicity, and Cultural Production in Post–Shining Path Peru	Liverpool University Press, 2015	
2016	Nancy J. Gates Madsen	Trauma, Taboo, and Truth-Telling: Listening to Silences in Postdictatorship Argentina	University of Wisconsin Press, 2016	
2017	B. Christine Arce	México’s Nobodies: The Cultural Legacy of the Soldadera and Afro-Mexican Women	SUNY Press, 2017	
2018	Maite Conde	Foundational Films: Early Cinema and Modernity in Brazil	University of California Press,2018	
2019	Nicholas R. Jones	Staging Habla de Negros: Radical Performances of the African Diaspora in Early Modern Spain	Penn State University Press, 2019	
2020	Anna Kathryn Kendrick	Humanizing Childhood in Early Twentieth-Century Spain	New York University Shanghai, 2020	
2021	Samuel Amago	Basura: Cultures of Waste in Contemporary Spain	Univ. of Virginia Press, 2021	
2022	Éric Morales-Franceschini	The Epic of Cuba Libre: The Mambí, Mythopoetics, and Liberation	University of Virginia Press, 2022	
2023	Catherine Brown	Remember the Hand: Manuscription in Early Medieval Iberia	Fordham University Press, 2023	
2023	Isabel C. Gómez	Cannibal Translation: Literary Reciprocity in Contemporary Latin America	Northwestern University Press, 2023	
2023	Amy E. Wright	Serial Mexico: Storytelling across Media, from Nationhood to Now	Vanderbilt University Press, 2023	

== See also ==
- Katherine Singer Kovács Society for Cinema and Media Studies Book Award
