= Debalina Majumder =

Indian filmmaker, photographer, writer, producer and cinematographer

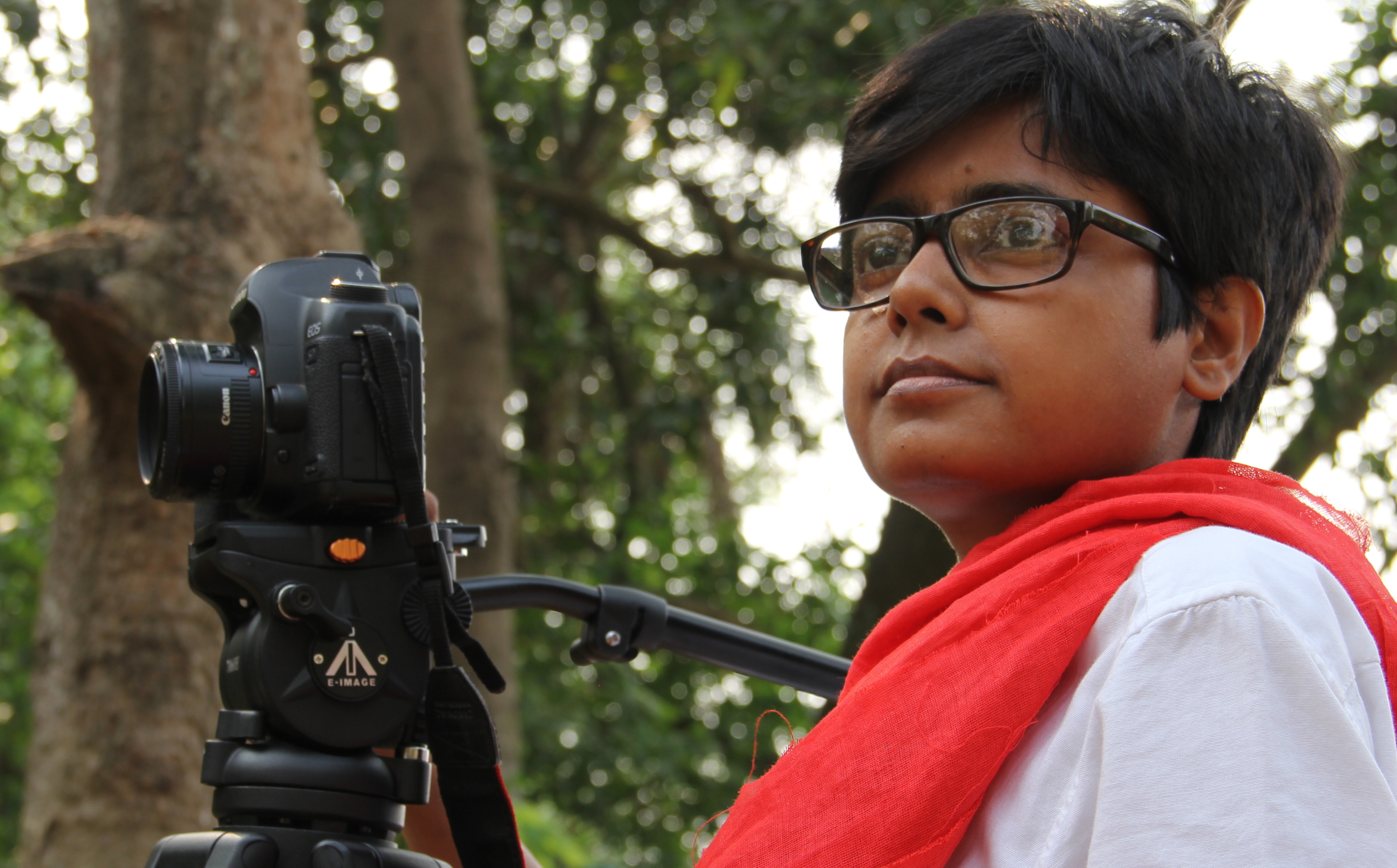
- Debalina Majumder
- Born: 1972 (age 53–54); Calcutta, India
- Occupation: filmmaker

Debalina Majumder (born 1972, Calcutta, India) is a prominent Indian filmmaker, photographer, writer, producer, and cinematographer, known for her work on social issues, gender and sexuality, as well as environmental activism. Debalina is a Berlinale Talent and a Global Media Makers Fellow. She studied Comparative Literature at Jadavpur University. Debalina has worked on feature-length documentary films, short films, travelogues, music videos, corporate films, telefilms and experimental films.

In between 2024 and 2025, Debalina spearheaded a campaign to save a tamarind tree in her neighbourhood. Planted by freemdom fighter Parul Mukherjee, this tree hosts more than fifteen species of birds, insects, reptiles, small animals, produces fruits, oxygen, shade and shelter. When the tree was under threat, due to proposed redevelopment of the area, Debalina launched a vibrant cultural movement and signature campaign to protect it. Through community initiatives like "Tamarind Tunes"/ "Tentultolar Gaan", live concerts like Live at Tentultala, Debalina successfully mobilized public support, leading the Kolkata Municipal Corporation to ensure the tree’s protection and the restructuring of property boundaries to keep it on public land.

This advocacy was bolstered by her 30-minute documentary, Friends of Jilipibala (Jilipibalar Bondhura), which premiered at the Kolkata International Film Festival in late 2025. The film uses 12 years of footage to document the diverse animal and bird life supported by the tree, framed through the perspective of a toddler named Jilipibala. it received a Special Jury Award in the Competition on Indian Documentaries.

A fictional documentary made by her in 2010, Taar Cheye Se Anek Aaro (More Than a Friend), based on queer relationship, was discussed in the Indian film chapter of Queer Cinema in the World, a book by Karl Schoonover and Rosalind Galt, along with the movie ‘Fire’.

Based on the story of two lovers who committed suicide, in the village of Nandigram (West Bengal, India), Debalina's film "... ebang bewarish" ("...and the Unclaimed"), questioned social taboos and familial non-acceptance in regards to same-sex relationship. " Based on the same event, Debalina's fiction film "Abar Jodi Ichha Koro" (If You Dare Desire) was released in 2017.

== Filmography ==
Year	Film	director	Cinematographer	Writer	Producer	Sound	Type
2025	Jilipibalar Bondhura (Friends of Jilipibala)	Yes	Yes	Yes	Yes		Experimental Documentary Short
2026	Citizen Nagar (Post-production)	Yes	Yes				Documentary
2023	Porshi Neeler Arshinagar (Beyond The Blues)	Yes	Yes	Yes			Documentary
2019	Gay India Matrimony	Yes	Yes	Yes			Documentary
2018	Tin Sottyi...(In Fact...)	Yes	Yes	Yes			Documentary
2017	Abar Jodi Ichchha Karo... (If you dare Desire...)	Yes	Co-cinematographer			Yes	Fiction
2016	Signature Film, Dialogues: Calcutta International LGBT Film & Video Festival	Yes					
2016	Rashmi Matric Pass	Yes					
2013	... ebang bewarish" ("...and the unclaimed")	Yes	Yes	Yes	Co-producer	Yes	Documentary
2012	Signature film, Dialogues:Calcutta International LGBT Film & Video Festival	Yes	Yes			Yes	
2010	Taar Cheye Se Anek Aaro (More Than a Friend)	Yes	Yes			Yes	Docu-fiction
2010	Signature film, Dialogues:Calcutta International LGBT Film & Video Festival	Yes	Yes			Yes	
2009	Habul & Co.	Yes					Fiction-Telefilm
2008	Katha (Monologues)	Yes	Yes	Yes		Yes	
2007	The Broken Land	Yes		Yes			
2006	Mother Courageous	Yes					
2005	Tomar Ghare Basat Kare Kaijana (The Wall & Other Stories)	Yes	Yes	Yes	Yes	Yes	Experimental
2005	A Stranger in a Bioscope	Yes		Yes			
2005	Bombagarh Natyacompany	Yes					Fiction-Telefilm
2004	Sar..rr..ra (Joy Run)	Yes	Yes			Yes	
