= Rolena Adorno =

American historian

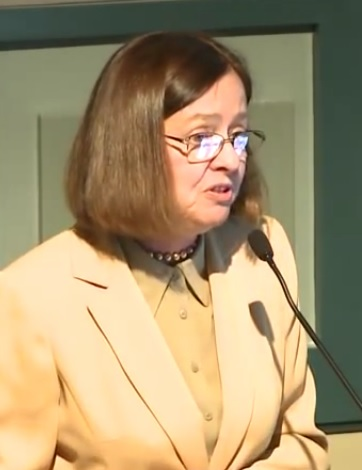
- Adorno in 2012
- Born: 5 November 1942 (age 83)

Rolena Adorno (born 5 November 1942) is an American humanities scholar, the Spanish Sterling Professor at Yale University and bestselling author.

Writing in 2001, and in the context of a favorable review of a "magnificent study" that she coauthored, James Axtell called her "perhaps the preeminent student of colonial Latin American literature".

== Honors ==
She was awarded the Katherine Singer Kovács Prize of the Modern Language Association of America for her book, The Polemics of Possession in Spanish American Narrative.

On 6 November 2009, she was appointed to the National Council on the Humanities, the advisory board for the National Endowment for the Humanities, by President Barack Obama.

She is a fellow of the American Academy of Arts and Sciences, and sits on the Board of Governors of the John Carter Brown Library.

== Lawsuit ==
In 2017, a former Spanish professor at Yale filed a lawsuit claiming that the Yale's Spanish and Portuguese department perpetuated a culture of harassment and discrimination. According to the lawsuit, Roberto González Echevarría, department chair Rolena Adorno, and department professor Noel Valis made "unsupportive and negative" statements in retaliation for plaintiff's speaking out against discrimination and sexual harassment, which had an impact in the plaintiff's tenure denial in 2015. The university newspaper Yale Daily News points out that despite a request for the administration to recuse Echevarria, Adorno, and Valis from the vote, they were allowed to participate and each voted against granting tenure to the plaintiff.

== Bibliography ==
Some of her most notable works are:

- Guaman Poma and His Illustrated Chronicles
- The Polemics of Possession in Spanish American Narrative
- Colonial Latin American Literature: A Very Short Introduction
- With Patrick Pautz, Álvar Núñez Cabeza de Vaca: His Account, His Life and the Expedition of Pánfilo de Narváez. 3 vols. Lincoln: University of Nebraska Press, 1999.
