= Noël Valis =

American writer, scholar and translator (born 1945)

Noël Ritter Valis (born 24 December 1945) is a writer, scholar and translator. She is Kingman Brewster, Jr. Professor of Spanish and Portuguese at Yale University.

== Biography ==
She was raised in Toms River, New Jersey and graduated from Toms River High School (now Toms River High School South) in 1964; she was inducted into the Toms River Regional Schools' Hall of Fame in 1995.

She received her B.A. from Douglass College (Rutgers University) and earned a Ph.D. in Spanish and French at Bryn Mawr College. An Hon. Woodrow Wilson Fellow and Fulbright Scholar, she is a recipient of fellowships from the John Simon Guggenheim Foundation and the National Endowment for the Humanities. Valis is a Full Member of the Academia Norteamericana de la Lengua Española (an affiliate of the Real Academia Española) and a Corresponding Member of the Real Academia Española, as well as the American Academy of Sciences and Letters. In 2017 she won the Victoria Urbano Academic Achievement Prize (Premio Victoria Urbano de Reconocimiento Académico), given by the International Association of Hispanic Women's Literature and Culture (Asociación Internacional de Literatura y Cultura Femenina Hispánica), for her work in Hispanic women's and gender studies.

Her research centers on modern Spanish literature, culture, and history. The Culture of Cursilería. Bad Taste, Kitsch, and Class in Modern Spain won the Modern Language Association's Katherine Singer Kovács Prize. Her translation of Noni Benegas's poetry, Burning Cartography, was awarded the New England Council of Latin American Studies' Best Book Translation Prize. She has also published a book of poetry, My House Remembers Me / Mi casa me recuerda, and a novella, The Labor of Longing, a Finalist for the Prize Americana for Prose and for the Next Generation Indie Book Awards in both the Novella and Regional Fiction categories. An interview with Host Laurence Sledak was recorded for Unwanted Artists on 11 March 2015 and released on 7 April 2015. It may be viewed on YouTube.

She served as a member of the National Council on the Humanities, the advisory board to the Chairman of the National Endowment for the Humanities (2019–22). In 2021, she was awarded the Cátedra Miguel Delibes/Miguel Delibes Chair and was also elected President of the Asociación Internacional de Galdosistas, the International Association of Galdós Scholars, for a three-year term.

Lorca After Life was the 2023 PROSE winner for Literature (Association of American Publishers).

== Works ==
=== Literary/Cultural Criticism ===
- Lorca After Life (Yale University Press, 2022)
- Realismo sagrado. Religión e imaginación en la narrativa española moderna (Calambur, 2017)
- Reading Twentieth-Century Spanish Literature. Selected Essays (Juan de la Cuesta, 2016)
- Sacred Realism. Religion and the Imagination in Modern Spanish Narrative (Yale University Press, 2010)
- The Culture of Cursilería. Bad Taste, Kitsch, and Class in Modern Spain (Duke University Press, 2002; Spanish version: La cultura de la cursilería. Mal gusto, clase y kitsch en la España moderna, Antonio Machado Libros, 2010)
- Reading the Nineteenth-Century Spanish Novel. Selected Essays (Juan de la Cuesta, 2005)
- The Novels of Jacinto Octavio Picón (Bucknell University Press, 1986; Spanish version: Jacinto Octavio Picón, novelista, Anthropos, 1991)
- The Decadent Vision in Leopoldo Alas. A Study of "La Regenta" and "Su único hijo" (Louisiana State University Press, 1981)

=== Edited volumes ===
- El vicio color de rosa. By Álvaro Retana (Renacimiento, 2023)
- Serenata del amor triunfante. By Pedro Badanelli (Renacimiento, 2016)
- Teaching Representations of the Spanish Civil War (Modern Language Association, 2007)
- In the Feminine Mode. Essays on Hispanic Women Writers (Bucknell University Press, 1990; 2nd ed., 1995) (co-ed. with Carol Maier)
- Poesías. By Carolina Coronado (Castalia / Instituto de la Mujer, 1991)
- Bocetos al temple. By José María de Pereda. In Obras completas, Vol. 3 (Tantín, 1990)
- La hijastra del amor. By Jacinto Octavio Picón (PPU, 1990)
- "Malevolent Insemination" and Other Essays on Clarín (Michigan Romance Studies Series, vol. 10, 1990)

=== Fiction and poetry ===
- The Labor of Longing. A Novella (Main Street Rag Publishing, 2014)
- My House Remembers Me / Mi casa me recuerda. Poetry (Esquío, 2003)

=== Translations ===
- Two Confessions. Essays by María Zambrano and Rosa Chacel. Translated by Noël Valis and Carol Maier (SUNY Press, 2015; ppr, 2016)
- Burning Cartography. Poetry by Noni Benegas (Host Publications, 2007; 2nd ed., 2011)
- The Poetry of Sara Pujol Russell (Susquehanna University Press, 2005)
- The-Poetry-Julia-Uceda-Nuestra/dp/0820424099 The Poetry of Julia Uceda (Lang, 1995)
- Prelude to Pleasure. By Pedro Salinas. Trans. of Víspera del gozo (Bucknell University Press, 1993)
- Las conjuradoras. Antología bilingüe de seis poetas norteamericanas de hoy (Esquío, 1993)

=== Bibliographies ===
- Leopoldo Alas (Clarín). An Annotated Bibliography. Supplement I (Boydell and Brewer/Tamesis, 2002)
- Leopoldo Alas (Clarín). An Annotated Bibliography (Grant & Cutler, 1986)
