= Clayton Eshleman =

American poet and translator (1935–2021)

- Born: June 1, 1935; Indianapolis, Indiana, U.S.
- Died: January 29, 2021 (aged 85); Ypsilanti, Michigan, U.S.
- Occupations: Poet, Translator, Editor
- Awards: National Book Award for Translation (1979); Landon Translation Prize; Guggenheim Fellowship in Poetry; NEA Grants; Rockefeller Study Center Residency; Witter Bynner award (Poetry Society of America, 1981).

Academic background
- Education: Indiana University

Academic work
- Discipline: English Literature, translation Studies
- Sub-discipline: Contemporary Poetry, Paleolithic Imagination
- Institutions: University of Maryland; California Institute of the Arts; California Institute of Technology; Eastern Michigan University
- Main interests: Paleolithic cave art, Poetry, Translation, Wilhelm Reich

Clayton Eshleman (June 1, 1935 – January 29 or 30, 2021) was an American poet, translator and editor, noted in particular for his translations of César Vallejo and his studies of cave painting and the Paleolithic imagination. Eshleman's work has been awarded with the National Book Award for Translation, the Landon Translation prize from the Academy of American Poets (twice), a Guggenheim Fellowship in Poetry, two grants from the National Endowment for the Arts, and a Rockefeller Study Center residency in Bellagio, Italy, among other awards and honors.

== Biography ==
=== 1935–1962 ===
Clayton Eshleman was born on June 1, 1935, in Indianapolis, Indiana. He is the son of Ira Clayton Eshleman (1895–1971) and Gladys Maine (Spenser) Eshleman (1898–1970). The poet's father was employed as a time-and-motion study efficiency engineer at Kingan and Company, a slaughterhouse and meat-packer. The family lived in the 1800 block of North Delaware Street. As a child the poet was forbidden from playing with children whose parents drank alcohol, with children of different races or religions, or whose mothers wore pants outside of the home.

Eshleman was exposed to the arts as a child through piano lessons and drawing classes focused on comic strips. In high school, Eshleman played football, ran track and wrestled. He worked as a lifeguard during the summer.

In 1951, Eshleman discovered jazz music, attracted in particular to the music of Bud Powell and Lennie Tristano. He began to spend time in jazz clubs and to play jazz alongside classical music. In 1953, Eshleman enrolled in Indiana University, majoring in music, but was not devoted to his studies. He pledged to the Phi Delta Theta fraternity. The hazing he endured during pledge week would become a significant topic in his poetry.

Pursuing his interest in jazz, Eshleman travelled to Los Angeles in the summer of 1954. He parked cars for a living and studied jazz piano with Marty Paitch and Richie Powell, the younger brother of Bud Powell. Returning to Indiana University in the fall, Eshleman changed his major to Business. His academic performance suffered. Put on academic probation for low grades, he was expelled for having too many parking tickets, but able to return to school the following year, this time as a Philosophy major.

Eshleman discovered poetry in creative writing classes at Indiana University. He studied 20th century American poetry with Samuel Yellin and Josephine Piercy. Jack and Ruth Hirschman introduced him to world poetry in translation, including Federico Garcia Lorca, Vladimir Mayakofsky, Rainer Maria Rilke, and St.-John Perse. Mary Ellen Solt introduced him, via correspondence, to Louis Zukofksy, Robert Creeley, and Cid Corman, as well as to poets closer to his own generation: Paul Blackburn, Robert Kelly, Jerome Rothenberg, Jackson Mac Low, and David Antin. Eshleman travelled frequently to New York City to meet with these poets in person. Through Paul Blackburn he would meet William Carlos Williams, Allen Ginsberg, and Denise Levertov.

Eshleman graduated from Indiana University with a degree in philosophy in 1958 but reenrolled as a graduate student in English Literature. He supported himself by playing piano in the bar of a steakhouse on weekends. Eshleman published his first poem in the Indiana University English Department student magazine, Folio. The following year, Eshleman took over the editorship of Folio for three issues. Eshleman gave his first reading of his own poetry in New York City at Metro Café in 1960. The reading was organized by Paul Blackburn.

Eshleman discovered the poetries of Pablo Neruda and César Vallejo in a copy of the Dudley Fitts edited Anthology of Contemporary Latin American Poetry (New Directions, 1947) given to him by Bill Paden in 1958. Motivated by his interest in Neruda and Vallejo, Eshleman hitchhiked to Mexico City in order to learn Spanish in the summers of 1959 and 1960. He began translating Neruda's Residencias at this time.

In 1961, Eshleman graduated from Indiana University with a Master of Arts degree in Teaching Creative Writing. That summer he married Barbara Novak and took a job teaching English for the University of Maryland, College Park, Far-Eastern Division (Japan, Taiwan, Korea). In the next year, he taught literature and composition to military personnel for two months in Tainan, Taiwan, four months at Tachikawa Air Force Base, outside Tokyo, and two months at the Strategic Air Command (SAC) Base in Seoul, Korea.

=== 1962–1972 ===
Eshleman met Cid Corman in person for the first time in San Francisco while en route to Asia. He met Gary Snyder and Joanne Kyger in Tokyo when they were en route to India. Following Snyder's suggestion, in the spring of 1962, Eshleman moved to Kyoto to teach English as a second language at Matsushita Electric Corporation in Kobe. He and Barbara would stay there until 1964.

While in Kyoto, Eshleman began what he would later describe as his “apprenticeship to poetry” by translating César Vallejo's Poemas humanos. Simultaneously he begins writing “The Tsuruginomiya Regeneration”: what would ultimately become a 350-page sequence of poems, eventually reedited and published as his book Coils (1973). Alongside his writing and translation, Eshleman studied William Blake, Northrop Frye's book on Blake, Fearful Symmetry, the I Ching, and world mythology. After working for several weeks outside under a persimmon tree inhabited by a large red, green and yellow spider, which subsequently disappeared, Eshleman had a visionary experience involving a spider which he interpreted as a totemic gift confirming his vocation as a poet.

During this period in Kyoto, Eshleman was close to several fellow artists and poets: Will Petersen, Gary Snyder, and Cid Corman, who was then editing the second series of Origin. His correspondents during the period include Paul Blackburn, W.S. Merwin, Jerome Rothenberg, and Robert Kelly. He published his first books during this period as well: Mexico and North and Residence on Earth, a translation of Neruda Residencias.

In 1964, the Eshlemans returned to Indiana for one year before moving, when Barbara was several months pregnant, to the Miraflores section of Lima, Peru, where Eshleman hoped to gain access to César Vallejo's manuscripts for the Poemas humanos, then in the possession of Vallejo's widow, Georgette. Georgette would ultimately deny him access to the manuscripts. Eshleman's initial translation of the Human Poems would not be published until 1968, when it was released by Grove Press.

Eshleman's experiences walking through the slums of Lima awakened his political conscience. At this time, he was also hired by the North American Peruvian Institute to edit a bilingual literary magazine, funded by the institute. He gave the collection the title Quena (in reference to a Quechuan flute). Writers and intellectuals in Lima assumed the magazine was cover for United States government espionage work. The magazine was suppressed by the Institute for political reasons prior to the publication of its first issue.

Eshleman's son, Matthew Craig Eshleman was born in Peru in 1966. Barbara Eshleman suffered nearly fatal complications from the birth. Thereafter the Eshlemans returned to Indiana briefly before moving to New York City in the summer of 1966. They separated in New York City that fall.

Over the next couple of years, Eshleman taught at the American Language Institute at New York University while participating actively in New York literary and artistic life.

==== Caterpillar magazine ====
In 1966 and 1967, he published a series of books under the Caterpillar Books imprint. These include titles by Aimé Césaire (in Eshleman's co-translation with Denis Kelly), Cid Corman, Paul Blackburn, Frank Samperi, David Antin, D. Alexander, Robert Vas Dias, Jackson Mac Low, and himself. In 1967, he founded and began editing Caterpillar magazine, which he would publish quarterly through 1970, and periodically thereafter, through 1973. The magazine was supported by grants from the Council of Literary Magazines and the National Translation Center as well as sales, advertisement, and donations. Caterpillar was of major significance for poets writing in the postmodern tradition during those years.

Eshleman was also active in the anti-war movement, particularly as an organizer and participant in the “Angry Arts” protest group. He was arrested and jailed for demonstration at St. Patrick's Cathedral. He also participated in a series of readings in Milwaukee and Seattle with Robert Bly, Robert Duncan, Allen Ginsberg, Ed Sanders and others to raise money for draft resisters.

Eshleman cultivated a wide circle of new and on-going friendships during these years, including Frank Samperi, Diane Wakoski, Adrienne Rich, Nora Jaffe, Leon Golub, Nancy Spero, Carolee Schneeman, James Tenney, Michael Heller, and Hugh Seidman, among others. Diane Wakoski introduced him to John Martin the publisher of Black Sparrow Press in 1968. Martin would become the principal publisher of Eshleman's writing beginning with the publication of “Cantaloups and Splendour” in 1968.

In 1967, Eshleman began Reichian psychotherapy therapy with Dr. Sidney Handelman, completing the analysis in 1969.

Eshleman met Caryl Reiter on New Year's Eve 1968. She would become his second wife. In 1970, the poet's mother died. His father died the following year.

In 1970, Clayton and Caryl moved from New York to Sherman Oaks, California. Shortly thereafter Eshleman joined the faculty of the School of Critical Studies at the California Institute of the Arts in Valencia, where he organized a reading series and taught seminars on contemporary poetry, William Blake, Wilhelm Reich, T.S. Eliot, and Hart Crane. Close friendships were formed during these years with Stan Brakhage, Robin Blaser, John and Barbara Martin, as well as with Robert Kelly, who was then teaching nearby at the California Institute of Technology.

In 1972, Eshleman met José Rubia and Eva Barcia. He and José Rubia Barcia began co-translating César Vallejo's España, aparta de mí este cáliz that year and shortly thereafter working on a new translation of the Human Poems. Eshleman also began translating Antonin Artaud at this time.

Under the influence of Mikhail Bakhtin's book Rabelais and His World, Eshleman began to re-organize “The Tsuruginomiya Regeneration” manuscript material into the book he published in 1973 as Coils. The publication brings closure to a project begun more than ten years earlier, in Kyoto. Eshleman also published the final issue of Caterpillar in 1973.

=== 1973–1986 ===
During the summer of 1973, the Eshlemans moved to France for one year. He and Caryl sublet an apartment in Montmartre and taught courses in American poetry at the American College in Paris.

In the spring of 1974, following the advice of the translator Helen Lane, the Eshlemans visited the Dordogne region of France. They rented a furnished apartment and begin visiting the Paleolithic painted caves in the area, including Lascaux. Eshleman decided to undertake an in-depth investigation into the Paleolithic imagination and the imagery of the painted caves. The project became a central area of his writing and research over the next three decades, resulting in the publication of his major work Juniper Fuse: Upper Paleolithic Imagination and the Construction of the Underworld in 2003. In addition to Lascaux, which Eshleman visited on several more occasions over the next twenty-five years, he visited Font-de-Gaume, Combarelles, Niaux, Garges, Marsoulas, Le Portel, Le Tuc d’Audoubert, and Les Trois Frères, among other sites. The project was supported at various points by grants from the Guggenheim Foundation, the National Endowment for the Arts, and the National Endowment for the Humanities. Beginning in 1981, he and Caryl organized and led a guided tour of the painted caves and the region in general. The tour continued irregularly, ultimately gaining sponsorship from the Ringling School of Art and Design in Sarasota, Florida, through 2008. Guest-lecturers on the tour included Robert Creeley and Gary Snyder among others.

In 1974, the Eshlemans returned to Los Angeles. The poet began teaching in the Extension Program of the University of California at Los Angeles and, in 1977, under an “Artist in the Community” teaching fellowship through the California Arts Council at Manual Arts High School in Los Angeles. In 1979, he was appointed Dreyfuss Poet-in-Residence and lecturer in creative writing at California Institute of Technology, Pasadena; a position he held through 1984. Thereafter he taught part-time as a visiting lecturer in creative writing through University of California campuses in San Diego, Riverside, Los Angeles, and Santa Barbara.

While conducting his research into the painted caves, Eshleman continued his work as a translator. Working with José Rubia Barcia, he completed new translations of César Vallejo's Complete Posthumous Poetry. Published by the University of California Press in 1978, the collection won the National Book Award for Translation the following year. Working with Norman Glass, Eshleman translated several major works by Antonin Artaud, published as Four Texts in 1982, and, beginning in 1977, working with Annette Smith, he translated the complete poetry of Aimé Césaire in several volumes. This work was supported by a translation grant from the National Endowment for the Humanities and, in 1981, it won the Witter Bynner award from the Poetry Society of America.

Alongside their repeated travels to visit the painted caves, the Eshlemans travelled more widely in Europe. In 1976, the poet lectured on American Literature during a “Summer Seminar” in Frenstat, Czechoslovakia, supported by the State Department. In 1978 and again in 1980, he spent one month in Germany under the auspices of the Visiting Author Program administered by the American Embassy in Bonn, Germany. In 1979, he visited Spain.

In 1979, Eshleman began writing regular book reviews for the Los Angeles Times. In 1982, he and Caryl began publishing short pieces of travel writing in magazines and newspapers including Destinations, Diversions, The Chicago Tribune, Frequent Flyer, and Pan Am Clipper. In 1983 and 1984, Eshleman edited a monthly poetry column for Los Angeles Weekly, entitled “Ill Fate and Abundant Wine.”

==== Sulfur magazine ====
In 1981, while teaching at Caltech, Eshleman founded his second major magazine Sulfur: A Literary Tri-Quarterly of the Whole Art. The journal would continue through 46 issues – across roughly 11,000 pages – the last issue appearing in spring 2000. From 1983 to 1996, Sulfur received partial funding from the National Endowment for the Arts.

=== 1986–2003 ===
In 1986, Clayton Eshleman became Professor of English at Eastern Michigan University in Ypsilanti, Michigan, where he would teach primarily introductory courses in poetry and poetry workshops.

That year a travel grant from the Soros Foundation funded a one-month trip to Hungary. While in Budapest, Eshleman co-translated a short anthology of contemporary Hungarian poetry with Gyula Kodolanyi, which he subsequently published in Sulfur 22.

Over the next three years Eshleman would publish, among other things, three volumes of selected writings: The Name Encanyoned River: Selected Poems 1960-1985 (1986), Antiphonal Swing: Selected Prose, 1962-1987 (edited by Caryl Eshleman, 1989), and Conductors of the Pit (1988), which is effectively a volume of selected translations.

Over the next fifteen years, Eshleman would share his work at colleges and university and poetry conferences around North America and Europe, travelling widely and often spending several months of each year as poet-in-residence or guest faculty at a wide variety of institutions, including, among many others, Naropa Institute, or traveling in Europe for his on-going research on the Paleolithic painted caves.

Eshleman continued co-translating the poetry of Aimé Césaire with Annette Smith, publishing Aimé Césaire, Lyric & Narrative Poetry, 1946-1982 (1990) and a second edition of Césaire's Notebook of a Return to the Native Land (2001). In 1992, Eshleman published his translation of César Vallejo's Trilce, a second edition of which won the Landon Translation Prize from the Academy of American Poets in 2000. In 1995, Eshleman published a volume of translations of the work of Antonin Artaud under title Watchfiends and Rack Screams: Works from the Final Period, co-translated with Bernard Bador, a selection of whose own poetry Eshleman had translated in 1986, as Sea Urchin Harakiri.

In 1997, while visiting Lascaux, Eshleman was permitted to descend into and examine the scene in the shaft of the cave for thirty minutes. He realized his investigation into the painted caves was complete.

Major collections of Eshleman's original poetry from these years include Hotel Cro-Magnon (1989), Under World Arrest (1994), and From Scratch (1998). In 2002, he published Companion Spider, a second volume of selected prose. In 2000, the final issue of Sulfur, issue 46, appeared.

=== 2003–2021 ===
Clayton Eshleman became emeritus Professor of English at Eastern Michigan University in 2003. That year, he also published Juniper Fuse: Upper Paleolithic Imagination & the Construction of the Underworld, the precipitate of more than 25 years of research and writing on the painted caves.

With his retirement from full-time teaching, Eshleman continued to travel widely throughout the United States and Europe to present his work at colleges and universities as well as poetry-related public events.

In 2004, 2006, 2007, and 2008, the Eshlemans again led tours of the painted caves of France, sponsored by the Ringling School of Art and Design in Sarasota, Florida.

In January 2004, Eshleman was invited to visit Chauvet cave with Jean-Marie Chauvet and James O’Hern. That year he also spoke at the Latin American House in Paris and at a poetry conference at the Bibliothèque Nationale de France. In November, he and Caryl spent the month at the Rockefeller Study Center at Bellagio, Italy, where Eshleman studied and wrote about Hieronymus Bosch's painting The Garden of Earthly Delights.

After retiring, Eshleman published several extended collections of his own later poetry, as well as new translations and collections of prose.

In 2005, Soft Skull released a substantially revised and extended second edition of Conductors of the Pit: Poetry Written in Extremis in Translation. Additional recent translations include Curdled Skulls (2010), selected poems by Bernard Bador, and Endure (2011), poetry by Bei Dao co-translated with Lucas Klein.

In 2007, the University of California Press released Eshleman's translation of César Vallejo, The Complete Poetry: A Bilingual Edition, the culmination of forty-five years of translation and research. The collection won Eshleman his second Landon Translation Prize from the Academy of American Poets. It was also on the International Shortlist for The Griffin Poetry Prize.

Later volumes of Eshleman's original poetry included My Devotion (2004), An Alchemist with One Eye on Fire (2006), Reciprocal Distillations (2007), Anticline (2010), and An Anatomy of the Night (2011). Two extended collections of the poet's prose have also appeared: Archaic Design (2007) and The Price of Experience (2013). The Grindstone of Rapport: A Clayton Eshleman Reader (2008) collects six hundred pages of poetry, prose, and translations from 45 years of writing.

In 2011, Wesleyan University Press released Eshleman's co-translation, with A. James Arnold, of Aimé Césaire's Solar Throat Slashed: The Unexpurgated 1948 Edition. This collection was followed in 2013 by a new translation, again by Eshleman and A. James Arnold, of Césaire's Original 1939 Notebook of a Return to a Native Land. Additional co-translations of Aimé Césaire's poetry are forthcoming from Wesleyan University Press.

Clayton lived with Caryl Eshleman in Ypsilanti, Michigan. He died on the night of January 29–30, 2021, at the age of 85.

== Literary career ==
Eshleman translated from the early 1960s. He and José Rubia Barcia jointly prepared The Complete Posthumous Poetry of César Vallejo (1978) and won the U.S. National Book Award in category Translation. He has also translated books by Aimé Césaire (with Annette Smith), Pablo Neruda, Antonin Artaud, Vladimir Holan, Michel Deguy and Bernard Bador. In 2006, a translation of The Complete Poetry of Cesar Vallejo, with an introduction by Mario Vargas Llosa, was published to much acclaim, won the 2008 Harold Morton Landon Translation Award from the Academy of American Poets, and was shortlisted for the 2008 International Griffin Poetry Prize.

Eshleman founded and edited two of the most seminal and highly regarded literary magazines of the period. Twenty issues of Caterpillar appeared between 1967 and 1973. In 1981, while Dreyfuss Poet in Residence at the California Institute of Technology, Eshleman founded Sulfur magazine. Forty-six issues appeared between 1981 and 2000, the year its final issue went to press. Eshleman describes his experience with the journal in an interview which appeared in an issue of Samizdat (poetry magazine).

Sometimes he is mentioned in the company of the "ethno-poeticists" associated with Jerome Rothenberg, including: Armand Schwerner, Rochelle Owens, Kenneth Irby, Robert Kelly, Jed Rasula, Gustaf Sobin, and John Taggart. Over the course of his life, his work has been published in over 500 literary magazines and newspapers. He read his work at more than 200 universities.

In the fall of 2005, Clayton and his wife Caryl were in residence at the Rockefeller Study Center at Bellagio on Lake Como, Italy, where he studied Hieronymus Bosch's "The Garden of Earthly Delights" and wrote a 67-page work on the triptych in poetry and prose, "The Paradise of Alchemical Foreplay".

=== Cave art ===
For over thirty years, Clayton Eshleman studied Ice Age cave art of southwestern France.

== Bibliography ==
=== Poetry ===
==== Books and Chapbooks ====
- Mexico and North (Tokyo, Japan: privately published, 1962). 54 pages.
- The Chavín Illumination (Lima, Peru: La Rama Florida, 1965). Revised edition reprinted in On Mules Sent From Chavin: A Journal and Poems. 16 pages.
- Lachrymae Mateo: Three Poems for Christmas, 1966 (New York: Caterpillar, Caterpillar Book 3, 1966). Reprinted in Indiana (Black Sparrow Press, 1969). 6 pages.
- Walks (New York: Caterpillar, Caterpillar Book 10, 1967). Partially reprinted in Indiana (Los Angeles: Black Sparrow Press, 1969). 47 pages.
- Cantaloups and Splendour (Los Angeles: Black Sparrow Press, 1968). Reprinted in Indiana (Los Angeles: Black Sparrow Press, 1969). 18 pages.
- Brother Stones (New York: Caterpillar, A Caterpillar Book, 1968). 19 Loose leaves with 6 woodcuts by William Paden. Partially reprinted in Indiana (Los Angeles: Black Sparrow Press, 1969). 19 pages.
- The House of Okumura (Toronto, Ontario, Canada: Weed/Flower, 1969). Partially reprinted in Coils (Los Angeles: Black Sparrow Press, 1973). 37 pages.
- Indiana (Los Angeles: Black Sparrow Press, 1969). 178 pages.
- T'ai (Cambridge, MA: Sans Souci Press, 1969). Reprinted in Coils (Los Angeles: Black Sparrow Press, 1973). 35 pages.
- A Pitch-blende (Berkeley, CA: Maya Quarto, 1969). 11 pages.
- The House of Ibuki (Freemont, MI: Sumac Press, 1969). 49 pages.
- The Yellow River Record (London, England: Big Venus Press, 1969). 12 pages.
- Altars (Los Angeles: Black Sparrow Press, 1971). 120 pages.
- Coils (Los Angeles: Black Sparrow Press, 1973). 147 pages. ISBN 9780876851548
- Human Wedding (Los Angeles: Black Sparrow Press, 1973). 8 pages.
- Aux Morts (Los Angeles: Black Sparrow Press, Sparrow 18, 1974). Partially reprinted in The Gull Wall (Los Angeles: Black Sparrow Press, 1975). 15 pages.
- Realignment (Kingston, NY: Treacle Press, 1974). Illustrated by Nora Jaffe. Partially reprinted in The Gull Wall (Los Angeles: Black Sparrow Press, 1975). 50 pages.
- Portrait of Francis Bacon (Sheffield, England: Rivelin Press, 1975). Reprinted in The Gull Wall (Los Angeles: Black Sparrow Press, 1975). 11 pages.
- The Gull Wall (Los Angeles: Black Sparrow Press, 1975). 111 pages. ISBN 9780876852361
- The Woman Who Saw through Paradise (Lawrence, KS: Tansy, Tansy 2, 1976). Reprinted in What She Means (Los Angeles: Black Sparrow Press, 1978). 8 pages.
- Cogollo (Newton, MA: Roxbury Poetry Enterprises, 1976). Partially reprinted in What She Means (Los Angeles: Black Sparrow Press, 1978). Withdrawn from circulation. 27 pages.
- Core Meander (Santa Barbara: Black Sparrow Press, Sparrow 57, 1977). Partially reprinted in What She Means (Los Angeles: Black Sparrow Press, 1978). 15 pages.
- Grotesca (London, England: New London Pride, 1977). Partially reprinted in The Gull Wall (Los Angeles: Black Widow Press, 1975) and in What She Means (Los Angeles: Black Sparrow Press, 1978). 38 pages.
- Oasis 19: New Poems and Translations by Clayton Eshleman (London, England: Oasis Books, 1977). Poems and translations, 39 pages.
- The Gospel of Celine Arnauld (Berkeley, CA: Tuumba Press, 1977). 19 pages.
- The Name Encanyoned River (Riverside, RI: The Woodbine Press, 1977). Reprinted in What She Means (Los Angeles: Black Sparrow Press, 1978). 30 pages.
- On Mules Sent from Chavin: A Journal and Poems (Swanea, UK: Galloping Dog Press, 1977). 70 pages.
- What She Means (Los Angeles: Black Sparrow Press, 1978). 194 pages. ISBN 9780876853474
- Nights We Put the Rock Together (Santa Barbara: Cadmus Editions, 1980). Partially reprinted in Hades in Manganese (Santa Barbara: Black Sparrow Press, 1981). 46 pages.
- The Lich Gate (Barrytown, NY: Station Hill Press, 1980). Partially reprinted in Hades in Manganese (Santa Barbara: Black Sparrow Press, 1981). 16 pages. ISBN 9780930794200
- Our Lady of the Three-Pronged Devil (New York: Red Ozier Press, 1981). Partially reprinted in Hades in Manganese (Santa Barbara: Black Sparrow Press, 1981). 32 pages.
- Foetus Graffiti (New Haven: Pharos Books, 1981). Reprinted in Fracture (Santa Barbara: Black Sparrow Press, 1983). 4 pages.
- Hades in Manganese (Santa Barbara: Black Sparrow Press, 1981). 114 pages.
- Visions of the Fathers of Lascaux (Los Angeles: Panjandrum Books, 1983). 27 pages.
- Fracture (Santa Barbara: Black Sparrow Press, 1983). 145 pages. ISBN 9780876855812
- The Name Encanyoned River: Selected Poems 1960-1985 (Santa Barbara: Black Sparrow Press, 1986). Introduction by Eliot Weinberger. 245 pages.
- Mistress Spirit (Los Angeles: Arundel Press, 1989). Reprinted in Hotel Cro-Magnon (Santa Rosa: Black Sparrow Press, 1989). 38 pages. ISBN 9780923980108
- Hotel Cro-Magnon. David R. Godine Publisher. 1989. ISBN 9780876857601.
- Under World Arrest (Santa Rosa: Black Sparrow Press, 1994). 197 pages. ISBN 9780876859353
- Nora's Roar (Boulder, CO: Rodent Press, 1996). Reprinted in From Scratch (Santa Rosa: Black Sparrow Press, 1998). 32 pages. ISBN 9781887289115
- From scratch. David R. Godine Publisher. 1998. ISBN 9781574230703.
- Hades en manganese. (Paris: Belin, 1998). French translation by Jean-Paul Auxemery.
- Erratics (Rosendale, NY: Hunger Press, 2000). Reprinted in My Devotion (Boston: Black Sparrow Books, 2004). 85 pages.
- Sweetheart (Ypsilanti, MI: Canopic Press, 2002). Reprinted in My Devotion (Boston: Black Sparrow Books, 2004). 10 pages.
- Bands of Blackness (Coulimer, France: Estepa Editions, 2002). Japanese translation by Eda Takaomi, French translation by Auxemery, with an engraving by Matsutani. Boxed edition, 24 pages.
- Everwhat (Canary Islands: Zasterle Press, 2003). Partially reprinted in Reciprocal Distillations (Boulder, CO: Hot Whiskey Press, 2007), An Alchemist with One Eye on Fire (Boston: Black Widow Press, 2006), and Archaic Design (Boston: Black Widow Press, 2007). 58 pages. ISBN 9788487467387
- My Devotion. David R. Godine Publisher. 2004. ISBN 9781574231922.
- An Alchemist with One Eye on Fire (Boston: Black Widow Press, 2006). 107 pages. ISBN 9780976844952
- Reciprocal Distillations. Hot Whiskey Press. 2007. ISBN 9780978693305., a collection of poems on art and artists, including Caravaggio, Leon Golub, Unica Zürn, Henri Michaux, Corot, Joan Mitchell, Henry Darger, African sculpture, Neolithic standing stones, and the Upper Paleolithic Chauvet Cave.
- Deep Thermal (Santa Barbara: Simplemente Maria Press, 2007). With digital prints by Mary Heebner. A 17” x 13” portfolio of six pigment prints and six letterpress poems printed in an edition 26 copies. 6 pages.
- A Shade of Paden (Hopewell, NJ: Piedoxen Printers, 2007). With a woodcut by Bill Paden. 10 pages.
- The Grindstone of Rapport: A Clayton Eshleman Reader (Boston: Black Widow Press, 2008). Selected poetry, prose, and translations, 619 pages.
- Hashigakari (Belgium: Tandem / Estepa, 2010). Translated by Jean-Paul Auxeméry and Takaomi Eda. Sign limited edition, 30 English / French, 30 English / Japanese, signed and numbered in a case with an etching by Matsutani. Reprinted in Anticline.
- Eternity at Domme / The French Notebooks (Paris: Estepa Editions, 2010). Translated by Jean-Paul Auxeméry, with monotypes by Kate van Houten, hand-bound, hard-bound edition of 200 signed and numbered on verge paper. Reprinted in Anticline (Boston: Black Widow Press, 2010). 26 pages.
- Anticline (Boston: Black Widow Press, 2010). 181 pages.
- An Anatomy of the Night (Buffalo: BlazeVOX Books, 2011). Reprinted in The Price of Experience. 65 pages.
- The Jointure (Buffalo: BlazeVOX Books, 2012). 38 pages.
- Nested Dolls (Buffalo: BlazeVOX Books, 2014). 24 pages.

==== Broadsides ====
- The Crocus Bud (Reno, NV: Camels Coming, 1965). 4 mimeographed pages.
- The Wand (Santa Barbara: Capricorn, 1971).
- The Bridge at the Mayan Pass (Valencia, CA: Peace Press, The Box, 1971). Reprinted in Coils (Los Angeles: Black Sparrow Press, 1973).
- One of the Oldest Dreams (Detroit: The Alternative Press, 1971).
- The Last Judgment: For Caryl Her Thirty-first Birthday, for the End of Her Pain (Los Angeles: Privately printed through Plantin Press, 1973).
- Still-Life, with Fraternity (Lawrence, KS: Cottonwood Review, 1976).
- For Mark Kritzer (Northridge, CA: Herb Yellin, 1977).
- Rancid Moonlight Hotel (Storrs, CT: University of Connecticut Library, 1977). Reprinted in What She Means (Santa Barbara: Black Sparrow Press, 1978).
- For Cheryl Lynn Wallach (Northridge, CA: Herb Yellin, 1978).
- Eternity (Los Angeles: Jazz Press, 1977). Reprinted in What She Means (Santa Barbara: Black Sparrow Press, 1978).
- Chrysanthemum Lane (Binghamton, NY: The Bellevue Press, 1978). Reprinted in What She Means (Santa Barbara: Black Sparrow Press, 1978).
- César Vallejo, Paris, October 1936 (Binghamton, NY: The Bellevue Press, 1978).
- Dot (Binghamton, NY: The Bellevue Press, 1978). Reprinted in Hades in Manganese (Santa Barbara: Black Sparrow Press, 1981).
- The American Sublime (Barrytown, NY: Station Hill Press, 1980). Reprinted in Hades in Manganese (Santa Barbara: Black Sparrow Press, 1981) and as “Un Poco Loco” in The Name Encanyoned River: Selected Poems (Santa Barbara: Black Sparrow Press, 1986).
- Aimé Césaire, The Woman and the Knife (New York: Red Ozier Press, 1981). Reprinted in Aimé Césaire, The Collected Poetry (Berkeley: University of California Press, 1983).
- Antonin Artaud, (from:) Suppôts et Suppliciations. (New York: Red Ozier Press, 1984). Co-translated with A. James Arnold. Reprinted in Antonin Artaud, Watch Fiends and Rack Screams (Cambridge, MA: Exact Change, 1995).
- Reagan at Bitberg (Santa Barbara: Table Talk Press, 1985). Reprinted in Hotel Cro-Magnon (Santa Barbara: Black Sparrow Press, 1989).
- Brown Thrasher (Ann Arbor, MI: Shaman Drum Bookshop, 1986). Reprinted in Hotel Cro-Magnon (Santa Barbara: Black Sparrow Press, 1989).
- Antonin Artaud, Indian Culture. (Ann Arbor: Other Wind Press, 1987). Co-translated with Bernard Bador. Artwork by Nancy Spero. Reprinted in Antonin Artaud, Watch Fiends and Rack Screams (Cambridge, MA: Exact Change, 1995).
- Picked up the Rotted Doormat (Encinitas, CA: Ta’Wil Broadside, 1993). Reprinted in Under World Arrest (Santa Rosa: Black Sparrow Press, 1994).
- El Mozote (Ashland, KY: Bullhead Broadside Series #1, 1995). Reprinted in From Scratch (Santa Rosa: Black Sparrow Press, 1998).
- Jisei (Ellsworth, ME: Backwoods Broadsides, 55, 2000).
- César Vallejo, Wedding March (Ellsworth, ME: Backwoods Broadsides, 99, 2006).

==== Translations ====
- Pablo Neruda, Residence on Earth (San Francisco: Amber House Press, 1962). 64 pages.
- Aimé Césaire, State of the Union (New York: Caterpillar, Caterpillar Book 1, 1966). Co-translated with Denis Kelly. 42 pages.
- César Vallejo, Poemas Humanos / Human Poems (New York: Grove Press, 1968). 326 pages.
- Antonin Artaud, Letter to André Breton (Los Angeles: Black Sparrow Press, Sparrow 23, 1974). Reprinted in Conductors of the Pit (Brooklyn: Soft Skull Press, 2005). 15 pages.
- César Vallejo, Spain, Take This Cup From Me (New York: Grove Press, 1974). Co-translated with José Rubia Barcia. 77 pages.
- Antonin Artaud, To Have Done With the Judgment of God (Los Angeles: Black Sparrow Press, Sparrow 23, 1975). Co-translated with Norman Glass. Reprinted in Antonin Artaud, Four Texts (Los Angeles: Panjandrum Books, 1982). 23 pages.
- Antonin Artaud, Artaud the Momo (Los Angeles: Black Sparrow Press, Sparrow 47, 1976). Co-translated with Norman Glass. Reprinted in Antonin Artaud, Four Texts (Los Angeles: Panjandrum Books, 1982). 23 pages.
- César Vallejo, Battles in Spain: Five Unpublished Poems (Santa Barbara: Black Sparrow Press, Sparrow 65, 1978). Co-translated with José Rubia Barcia. Reprinted in César Vallejo, The Complete Posthumous Poetry (Berkeley: University of California Press, 1978). 15 pages.
- César Vallejo, The Complete Posthumous Poetry (Berkeley: University of California Press, 1978). Co-translated with José Rubia Barcia. 339 pages.
- Aimé Césaire, Some African Poems in English (Pasadena, CA: Munger Africana Library, California Institute of Technology, 1981). Co-translated with Annette Smith. Reprinted in Aimé Césaire, The Collected Poetry (Berkeley: University of California Press, 1983). 15 pages.
- Antonin Artaud, Four Texts (Los Angeles: Panjandrum Books, 1982). Co-translated with Norman Glass. 99 pages.
- Aimé Césaire, The Collected Poetry (Berkeley: University of California Press, 1983). Co-translated with Annette Smith. 408 pages.
- Michel Deguy, Given Giving: Selected Poems (Berkeley: University of California Press, 1984). 189 pages.
- Antonin Artaud, Chanson (New York: Red Ozier Press, 1985). Drawings by Nancy Spero. Reprinted in Watch Fiends and Rack Screams (Cambridge, MA: Exact Change, 1995). 17 pages.
- Bernard Bador, Sea Urchin Harakiri (Los Angeles: Panjandrum Press, 1986). 128 pages.
- Aimé Césaire, Lost Body (New York: Braziller, 1986). Co-translated with Annette Smith. Reprinted from Aimé Césaire, The Collected Poetry (Berkeley: University of California Press, 1983). 131 pages.
- Conductors of the Pit: Major Works by Rimbaud, Vallejo, Césaire, Artaud, Holan (New York: Paragon House, 1988). Reprinted in revised second edition Conductors of the Pit (Brooklyn: Soft Skull Press, 2005). 242 pages.
- Aimé Césaire, Lyric & Narrative Poetry, 1946-1982 (Richmond: University of Virginia Press, 1990). Co-translated with Annette Smith. 235 pages.
- César Vallejo, Trilce (New York: Marsilio Publishers, 1992). 304 pages.
- Antonin Artaud, Watchfiends and Rack Screams: Works from the Final Period (Boston: Exact Change, 1995). Co-translated with Bernard Bador. 342 pages.
- César Vallejo, Trilce (Middleton, CT: Wesleyan University Press, 2000).
- Aimé Césaire, Notebook of a Return to the Native Land (Middletown, CT: Wesleyan University Press, 2001). Co-translated with Annette Smith. Revised second edition. 63 pages.
- Conductors of the Pit: Poetry Written in Extremis in Translation (Brooklyn, NY: Soft Skull Press, 2005). Second edition, substantially revised of Conductors of the Pit (New York: Paragon House, 1988). 242 pages.
- César Vallejo (2006). Clayton Eshleman (ed.). The Complete Poetry: A Bilingual Edition. University of California Press. ISBN 9780520932142. "Clayton Eshleman."
- Bernard Bador, Curdled Skulls: Selected Poems (Boston: Black Widow Press, 2010). Some of these translations originally appeared in Sea Urchin Harakiri (Los Angeles: Panjandrum Press, 1986). 117 pages.
- Bei Dao, Daydream (Minneapolis, MN: OHM Editions, 2010). Co-translated with Lucas Klein. Reprinted in Bei Dao, Endure. 23 pages.
- Bei Dao, Endure (Boston: Black Widow Press, 2011). Co-translated with Lucas Klein. 131 pages.
- Aimé Césaire, Solar Throat Slashed: The Unexpurgated 1948 Edition. (Middleton, CT: Wesleyan University Press, 2011). Co-translated with A. James Arnold. 183 pages.
- Aimé Césaire, The Original 1939 Notebook of a Return to a Native Land: Bilingual edition (Middleton, CT: Wesleyan University Press, 2013). Co-translated with A. James Arnold. 120 pages.
- José Antonio Mazzotti, Sakra Boccata (New York: Ugly Duckling Presse, 2013). 70 pages.

=== Prose ===
==== Books and Chapbooks ====
- Bearings (Santa Barbara: Capricorn Press, 1971). 22 pages.
- The Sanjo Bridge (Los Angeles: Black Sparrow Press, Sparrow 2, 1972). 15 pages.
- A Note on Apprenticeship (Chicago: Two Hands Press, 1979). 6 pages.
- Antiphonal Swing: Selected Prose 1962-1987 (Kingston, NY: McPherson, 1989). Edited by Caryl Eshleman, Introduction by Paul Christensen. 256 pages.
- Novices: A Study of Poetic Apprenticeship (Los Angeles: Mercer & Aitchison, 1989). 79 pages.
- The Aranea Constellation (Minneapolis: Rain Taxi, Brainstorm Series 1, 1998). Reprinted in Juniper Fuse (Middleton, CT: Wesleyan University Press, 2003). 17 pages.
- A Cosmogonic Collage: Sections I, II, & V (Ypsilanti, MI: Canopic Press, 2000). Reprinted in Juniper Fuse. 38 pages.
- Companion Spider: Essays. Wesleyan University Press. 2010. ISBN 9780819570581.
- Juniper Fuse: Upper Paleolithic Imagination & the Construction of the Underworld *. Wesleyan University Press. 2003. ISBN 9780819566058.
- Archaic Design (Boston: Black Widow Press, 2007). 342 pages.
- The Price of Experience (Boston: Black Widow Press, 2013). 483 pages.

==== Editor ====
- Folio (Bloomington, IN) 3 issues, 1959–1960.
- Quena (Lima, Peru) 1 issue, suppressed by North American Peruvian Cultural Institute, 1966.
- Caterpillar (New York City – Los Angeles) 20 issues, 1967–1973.
- A Caterpillar Anthology (New York: Doubleday, 1971).
- Sulfur (Pasadena – Los Angeles – Ypsilanti) 46 issues, 1981–2000.
- Paul Blackburn, The Parallel Voyages (Tucson, AZ: SUN/Gemini Press 1987). Co-edited with Edith Jarolim.
- A Sulfur Anthology (Middleton, CT: Wesleyan University Press, 2016).

=== Archival Materials ===
- Lilly Library, Indiana University
- Fales Library, New York University
- The Archive for New Poetry, University of California, San Diego
- Beinecke Rare Book and Manuscript Library, Yale University

=== Books about Clayton Eshleman ===
- Martha J. Sattler, Clayton Eshleman: A Descriptive Bibliography (Jefferson, NC: McFarland & Company, American Poetry Contemporary Bibliography Series no. 4, 1988).
- Paul Christensen, Minding the Underworld: Clayton Eshleman and Late Postmodernism (Santa Rosa: Black Sparrow Press, 1991).
- Stuart Kendall, edited. Clayton Eshleman: The Whole Art (Boston: Black Widow Press, 2014).
