= Idelber Avelar =

Brazilian scholar

Full Professor Idelber Avelar
- Born: October 31, 1968; Uberaba, Minas Gerais, Brazil
- Occupation(s): Professor, Literary and cultural criticism

Academic work
- Discipline: Literary critic, Cultural critic
- Website: https://www.idelberavelar.com

Idelber Avelar (Belo Horizonte, October 31, 1968) is a Brazilian scholar working in the field of literary and cultural studies. In 2000, the academic community took note of his book, The Untimely Present: Postdictatorial Latin American Fiction and the Task of Mourning , while the public at large came to know him through his blog, O Biscoito Fino e a Massa (in Portuguese), in which he discussed politics, pop culture, and literature. His work deals with the literary representation of Latin-American dictatorships and the way culture deals with the repercussions of said regimes.

== Life ==
Avelar completed his B.A. in Anglo-American literature at the Federal University of Minas Gerais, Brazil, in 1990. In the same year, he moved to the United States, where he finished his Ph.D. in Spanish and Latin American studies at Duke University. His dissertation focused in post-dictatorial Latin American literature. Also in 1996, Avelar accepted an invitation to work at the University of Illinois.

In 1999, he received the Katherine Singer Kovács prize, given by the MLA, (Modern Language Association) for his book The Untimely Present, chosen as the outstanding book in the fields of Spanish and Latin American literature and culture.

In 2000, he took up a teaching position at Tulane University, in New Orleans. In 2004, after the publication of The Letter of Violence: Essays on Narrative, Ethics and Politics, Avelar was made a full professor at Tulane University.

In 2006, Avelar's essay Ritmos do popular no erudito: política e música em Machado de Assis won the first international essay contest about Machado de Assis held by the Brazilian Ministry of Foreign Affairs (Itamaraty).

In 2009, he was the recipient of the American Council of Learned Societies’ grant for research on masculinity, which generated papers on Gilberto Freyre , Jorge Luis Borges , Gustavo Ferreyra , Fernando Gabeira, Caio Fernando Abreu and João Gilberto Noll , among others.

In 2010, Avelar represented Latin America at the Primero Encuentro Internacional de Escritores de Ásia, África y América Latina, held by the Cultural Foundation of Incheon, in South Korea. Between 2009 and 2012, he collaborated with Revista Fórum, where he penned a column about politics in Brazil, USA, and Latin America.

In November 2014, edited screenshots of personal, erotically charged messages between Avelar and two women who remained anonymous were published on the internet. This unleashed a campaign of online shaming, to which Avelar responded in his own blog. Subsequently, in court, both women denied having published the messages or being harassed.

In 2014, Avelar published Crônicas do Estado de Exceção (Editora Azougue).

In 2015, Instituto Caro y Cuervo, from Bogotá, published Transculturación en suspenso: Los orígenes de los cánones narrativos colombiano.

In 2016, he published Figuras de la violencia: ensayos sobre narrativa, política y música popular (Editorial Palinodia, Chile), and articles on the music of the Brazilian heavy metal band Sepultura (in Journal of Latin American Cultural Studies) . Also in the same year, Avelar co-edited, with Christopher Dunn, the volume Brazilian Popular Music and Citizenship .

Between 2014 and 2018, Avelar also published essays on recent Brazilian political processes in magazines such as the Luso-Brazilian Review, Transas (Buenos Aires), Lugar Comum (Rio de Janeiro), and the Journal of Latin American Cultural Studies (London).

Currently, Avelar is a professor at Tulane University and is mostly focused on Latin American literature, critical theory, and cultural studies.

== Works ==
=== The Untimely Present: Postdictatorial Latin American Fiction and the Task of Mourning ===
In his best known book, published in 1999, Avelar suggests that writing about the experience of a dictatorship is hindered by a form of recollection that is characteristic of the market, where the old is always entirely replaced with the new, leaving no traces of the connection between these two instances . Avelar compares this type of memory with the allegoric approach, which preserves the outcomes of the past in the present, even when they are negative – such as that which the past had to forget so it could come into being: in the case of dictatorships, torture, disappearances, and violence used to contain social upheaval during this time. Allegoric writing introduces the horror of the dictatorship into the present, challenging the appeasing narrative of the transition to democracy.

Avelar uses the figure of mourning to address discourses on the dictatorships that brought down the left-wing Latin American governments during the 60's and 70's. There's a process of mourning that conceals the bonds between the dictatorship and the posterior democracy. Going against this appeasing narrative, the novels by the authors analyzed in the book upset the post-dictatorial discourse and affirm effective values that survived these changes. That is, circumstances that are not compatible with market's form of recollection.

=== The Letter of Violence ===
In 2004, Palgrave MacMillan published Avelar's The Letter of Violence: Essays on Narrative, Ethics, and Politics, a collection of essays addressing the convergence of the rhetorical and the political dimensions of violence .

Later expanded, the work was translated into Portuguese (Figuras da Violência: ensaios sobre narrativa, ética e música popular, UFMG, 2011) and, later, into Spanish (Figuras de la violencia: Ensayos sobre narrativa, política y música popular, Palinodia, 2016).

The book's conclusion considers the concept of ‘perpetual war’ as it examines the North-American invasion of Iraq and Afghanistan.

=== Crônicas do estado de exceção ===
In December 2014, Editorial Azougue, from Rio de Janeiro, published Crônicas do Estado de Exceção (in Portuguese) , a collection of 32 texts concerned with politics. The texts are unfoldings of articles previously published in media outlets such as Folha de São Paulo, Revista Fórum, and even Avelar's own blog, O Biscoito Fino e a Massa.

The book's 32 essays are divided into four parts: United States, Brazil, Palestine, and The World.

=== Transculturación en suspenso ===
In 2016, Instituto Caro y Cuervo, from Bogotá, published Avelar's Transculturación en suspenso: los orígenes de los cánones narrativos colombianos (in Spanish) .

The work examines the origins of the novel in the four great regions of Colombia: the Caribbean, the central area of Cundinamarca – including Bogotá -, the Valle del Cauca, and Antioquia. Avelar discusses how Colombia was the only South-American country that was not unified during the 19th century and reviews the canon of the four great regions.

In his conclusion, Avelar highlights the considerable autonomy of Colombian regions during the 19th century, a unique case in Latin-American literature.
