= Rubén Gallo =

American academic

Rubén Gallo is the Walter S. Carpenter Jr. Professor in Language, Literature, and Civilization of Spain at Princeton University, specializing in modern and contemporary Spanish America. He also serves as Professor of Spanish and Portuguese Languages and Cultures, and has directed Princeton's program in Latin American Studies since 2008. He holds a B.A. in English from Yale University and a Ph.D. in comparative literature from Columbia University.

At Princeton, he has organized conferences on "Radio and the Avant-Garde" (2003) and "Stadiums: Athletics, and Aesthetics" (2004), and "Freud and 20th Century Culture" (2010).

In the winter semester of 2009–2010, Gallo was the Fulbright–Freud Visiting Lecturer in Psychoanalysis at the Sigmund Freud Museum in Vienna, Austria, and he presented the seminar "Freud at Large: The Cultural Reception of Psychoanalysis in Latin America and Beyond" in the Institute for History at the University of Vienna. He now serves on the board of directors of the Freud Museum Vienna.

He decided to write a book about Freud's relationship with Mexico and Freud's influence on Mexican poets and artists, because while there were already books about Freud in Russia, France, and Argentina, there was none about Mexico. He first became acquainted with Freud through a seminar of Julia Kristeva.

Gallo's Princeton faculty page states that "he teaches courses on Freud, the avant-garde, and other aspects of twentieth-century culture".

Gallo was elected as a member of the American Academy of Arts and Sciences in 2020.

Gallo is a member of the editorial advisory board for the EXPeditions website.

== Books ==
- New Tendencies in Mexican Art, Palgrave Macmillan, August 2004, ISBN 9781403961013.
- The Mexico City Reader (editor), University of Wisconsin Press, 2004, ISBN 9788475067148.
  - Spanish-language edition: México DF: Lecturas para paseantes, Editorial Oceano De Mexico, 2005, ISBN 9788475067148.
  - French edition (transl. Svetlana Doubin): Mexico : Chroniques Littéraires D'une Mégalopole Baroque, Éditions Autrement, 2007, ISBN 9782746710061.
  - Reviewed by Diane E. Davis and by Judith Adler Hellman.
- Mexican Modernity, MIT Press, December 2005, ISBN 9780262514965.
  - Katherine Singer Kovács Prize (Modern Language Association), 2005.
  - Reviewed by Susanne Einegel and by David William Foster.
- Heterodoxos mexicanos: una antología dialogada, México, D.F.: Fondo de Cultura Económica, December 2006, ISBN 9681681096.
- Las artes de la ciudad: Ensayos Sobre la Cultural Visual de la Capital, Fondo de Cultura Económica, August 2010, ISBN 9786071602473.
- Freud’s Mexico: Into the Wilds of Psychoanalysis, MIT Press, October 2010, ISBN 9780262014427.
  - Gradiva award (National Association for the Advancement of Psychoanalysis), 2011.
  - Reviewed by Samuel Steinberg, Emily Hind, and Mark Stafford.
- Proust's Latin Americans, Johns Hopkins University Press, June 2014, ISBN 9781421413457.
