= Katherine Singer Kovács Society for Cinema and Media Studies Book Award =

Katherine Singer Kovács Society for Cinema and Media Studies Book Award is a book award that is given annually for outstanding scholarship in cinema and media studies. The award is made annually by the Society for Cinema and Media Studies and includes a prize of 1500 dollars. The prize is named in honour of Katherine Singer Kovács.

== Award ==
- 2024 Holt, Jennifer (2022). Cloud Policy: A History of Regulating Pipelines, Platforms, and Data. Boston, Massachusetts: MIT Press. ISBN 9780262378680. OCLC 1415748020.
- 2023 Kaveh, Askari (2022). Relaying Cinema in Midcentury Iran: Material Cultures in Transit. Oakland, California: University of California Press. ISBN 9780520329768. OCLC 1264172872.
- 2022 Wasson, Haidee (2021). Everyday movies portable film projectors and the transformation of American culture. Oakland, California: University of California Press. ISBN 9780520331693. OCLC 1264265028.
- 2021 Wanzo, Rebecca Ann (2020). The content of our caricature : African American comic art and political belonging. Postmillennial pop. New York: New York University Press. ISBN 9781479840083. OCLC 1120783866.
- 2020 Street, Sarah; Yumibe, Joshua (2019). Chromatic modernity : color, cinema, and media of the 1920s. Film and culture. New York: Columbia U.P. ISBN 9780231179836. OCLC 1103242519.
- 2019 Murray, Susan (2018). Bright signals : a history of color television. Sign, storage, transmission. Durham: Duke University Press. ISBN 978-0-8223-7130-4.
- 2018 Schoonover, Karl; Galt, Rosalind (2016). Queer cinema in the world. Durham: Duke University Press. ISBN 9780822362463. OCLC 1153048686.
- 2017 Waugh, Thomas (2016). The conscience of cinema : the films of Joris Ivens 1912-1989. Framing film. Amsterdam: Amsterdam University Press. ISBN 9789048525256. OCLC 1028051107.
- 2016 Rivero, Yeidy M. (2015). Broadcasting modernity : Cuban commercial television, 1950-1960. Console-ing passions. Durham: Duke University Press. ISBN 9780822358718. OCLC 995294735.
- 2015 Rodowick, David Norman (2014). Elegy for theory. ACLS Humanities E-Book. Cambridge, MA: Harvard University Press. ISBN 978-0674046696. OCLC 1205073759.
- 2014 Tweedie, James (2013). The age of new waves : art cinema and the staging of globalization. Oxford: Oxford University Press. ISBN 9780199858286. OCLC 1056503930.
- 2013 Hansen, Miriam (2012). Cinema and experience : Siegfried Kracauer, Walter Benjamin, and Theodor W. Adorno. Weimar and now, 44. Berkeley: University of California Press. ISBN 978-0520265608. OCLC 800938785.
- 2012 Corrigan, Timothy (2011). The essay film : from Montaigne, after Marker. Oxford: Oxford University Press. ISBN 9780199781690. OCLC 747571357.'
- 2011 LaMarre, Thomas (2009). The Anime Machine: A Media Theory of Animation. Minneapolis: University of Minnesota Press. ISBN 9780816651559. OCLC 951188720.
- 2010 Pick, Zuzana M. (2010). Constructing the image of the Mexican Revolution : cinema and the archive (1st ed.). Austin: University of Texas Press. ISBN 978-0292725621. OCLC 1063433270.
- 2009 Johnson, Victoria E. (2008). Heartland TV : prime time television and the struggle for U.S. identity. New York: New York University Press. ISBN 9780814742938. OCLC 1168594858.

== See also ==
- Katherine Singer Kovács Prize
