= Mabel Moraña =

Uruguayan intellectual & academic (born 1948)

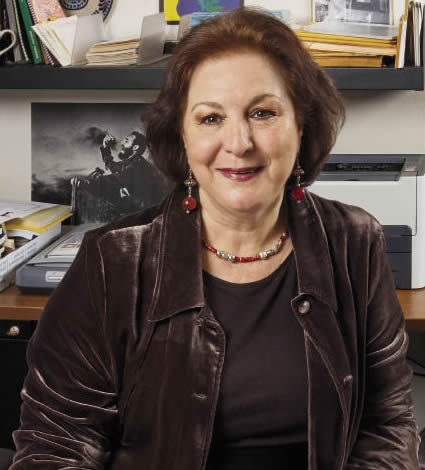
- Occupations: William H. Gass Professor of Arts and Sciences

Academic background
- Education: University of Minnesota

Academic work
- Institutions: Washington University in St. Louis
- Website: en.mabelmorana.com

Mabel Moraña (born in Montevideo, Uruguay, on February 20, 1948) is an intellectual and academic who has worked internationally in the fields of literary and cultural criticism in Latin America, being the author of numerous interdisciplinary publications that articulate perspectives on philosophy, anthropology, history, and cultural theory. Currently she is the William H. Gass Professor in Arts and Sciences at Washington University in St. Louis (St. Louis, Missouri). She is also the Director of the Latin American Studies Program at the same institution. Her research work spans from the Colonial Period, particularly focusing on the Baroque, to the present. Her main contributions are in the areas of the study of national cultures, modernity, postcolonialism, and the history of ideas. Moraña has published articles and books on Andean cultures, Mexican literature and culture, as well as transnational issues. She has contributed to the critical development of categories such as the monstrous, migration, violence, issues related to gender, race and ethnicity, critiques of modernity, Postcolonial Theory, among other topics.

Her book Arguedas/Vargas Llosa. Dilemas y ensamblajes (Iberoamericana Vervuert, 2013) won an award by the Modern Language Association (MLA). The English translation by Andrew Ascherl, Arguedas/Vargas Llosa. Dilemmas and Assemblages (Palgrave Macmillan, 2014) was also awarded by the Latin American Studies Association (LASA).

== Professional life ==
=== Research ===
Her critical work has been developing since the late 1970s, after leaving her home country, Uruguay, due to the dictatorship of 1973 to 1985. She settled for a few years in Venezuela, where Moraña became part of the famous team of international Latin American scholars at the Centro de Estudios Latinoamericanos Rómulo Gallegos, including distinguished intellectual figures such as Nelson Osorio, Beatriz González Stephan, Domingo Miliani, Carlos Rincón, Hugo Achugar, Mario Sambarino and many others. There she established her first interactions with Antonio Cornejo Polar, Tomás Eloy Martínez, Jean Franco, Heloísa Buarque de Hollanda, and Ángel Rama.

Continuing her humanistic training, which had culminated in Uruguay with degrees in Literature and Philosophy awarded by the Instituto de Profesores Artigas, she studied for a Master's degree in Philosophy at the Universidad Andrés Bello, in Caracas, Venezuela, working particularly with Arturo Ardao and other important academics from various countries. Afterwards, she migrated to the United States to pursue her Doctoral degree in Literature, at the University of Minnesota, under the direction of Hernán Vidal, which strengthen her orientation towards the studies of ideology, Marxism, and socio-historical approaches. During those years, Moraña worked intensively on Uruguayan culture under the dictatorship, particularly on issues of censorship and self-censorship, cultures of exile and historical memory.

Since the 1990s, Mabel Moraña's critical perspective became closely associated with the studies of Jesús Martin Barbero, Antonio Cornejo Polar, Nelly Richard, Ángel Rama and other representatives of Latin American Cultural Studies, with whom she has maintained close intellectual ties for many decades. Her critical work has been published by prestigious publishing houses, universities and private companies in the United States, Spain, Chile, Mexico, Uruguay, France, among others, and her articles have appeared in numerous specialized magazines.

=== Teaching ===
She was professor of Latin American studies at various universities, such as University of Washington, the University of Southern California, the University of Pittsburgh and currently, in the College of Arts and Sciences at Washington University in St. Louis

She was a visiting professor at the University of California, Santa Cruz, Harvard University, and Universidad de los Andes, Universidad de la República, Universidad Andina Simón Bolívar, and several German universities.

Moraña gave lectures and courses at the Universidad Nacional de Rosario, Universidad Nacional Autónoma de México, Pontificia Universidad Javieriana, Casa de las Américas, University of Seoul, Universidad de Granada, and at the Université Paris-Sorbonne and other French universities under the auspices of the Maison de Sciences de l'Homme. She has lectured and participated in numerous symposia and congresses in many Latin American countries, Canada, Switzerland, Italy, and more.

=== Editorial work ===
In addition to her critical work, Mabel Moraña is known for her editorial work as well. She has edited and co-edited several books on Latin American socio-cultural issues, and was Director of Publications for the Instituto Internacional de Literatura Iberoamericana for ten years, where she published the Revista Iberoamericana and five series of books, three of which were created by herself. The IILI publications and congresses during those years markedly modified the profile of this institution, giving way to Cultural studies and the critical-theoretical renewal of Literary Studies. Convergently, Moraña has organized numerous interdisciplinary congresses of international impact on cultural studies, social change, biopolitics, affections, migration, and many other topics, encouraging the intellectual interconnection between Latin America, North America, and the Caribbean, and promoting the dissemination of knowledge at all levels.

She has been interviewed numerous times, on radio, television, and in periodicals from different countries.

== Works ==
=== Single-authored books ===
Chronological list of some of Mabel Moraña's books as single author.

- Literatura y cultura nacional en Hispanoamérica 1910–1940 (Minneapolis: Institute for the Study of Ideologies and Literatures, 1984)
- Políticas de la escritura en América Latina. De la Colonia a la Modernidad (Caracas: Ediciones eXcultura, 1997)
- Viaje al silencio. Exploraciones del discurso barroco (Mexico: Universidad Nacional Autónoma de México, 1998)
- Crítica impura. Estudios de literatura y cultura latinoamericanas (Madrid/Frankfurt: Iberoamericana – Vervuert, 2004)
- La escritura del límite (Madrid/Frankfurt: Iberoamericana – Vervuert, 2010)
- Inscripciones críticas. Estudios sobre cultura latinoamericana (Santiago de Chile: Editorial Cuarto Propio, 2014)
- Bourdieu en la periferia. Capital simbólico y campo cultural en América Latina (Santiago de Chile: Cuarto Propio, 2014)
- Churata postcolonial (Lima: Centro de Estudios Literarios Antonio Cornejo Polar, Latinoamericana Editores, 2015)
- Arguedas/Vargas Llosa: Dilemmas and Assemblages. Translated by Andrew Ascherl (New York: Palgrave Macmillan, 2016)
- The Monster as War Machine. Translated by Andrew Ascherl (Amherst: Cambria Press, 2018)
- Philosophy and Criticism in Latin America: From Mariátegui to Sloterdijk. Translated by Andrew Ascherl (Amherst: Cambria Press, 2020)
- Pensar el cuerpo. Historia, materialidad y símbolo (Barcelona: Herder Editora, 2021)
- Líneas de fuga. Ciudadanía, frontera y sujeto migrante (Madrid/Frankfurt: Iberoamericana – Vervuert, 2021)
- "Nosotros, los bárbaros": tres narradores mexicanos en el siglo XXI (México: Bonilla Artigas Editores, 2021)

=== Anthologies of academic articles ===
- Territorios y forasteros: retratos y debates latinoamericanos, edited by Alicia Ortega Caicedo (Guayaquil: Ediciones Universidad de las Artes, 2015)
- Entre Incas y Pishtacos: Estudios sobre Literatura y Cultura Peruana (Lima: Centro de Estudios Literarios Antonio Cornejo Polar, 2018)
- Momentos críticos. Literatura y cultura en América Latina (Bogotá: Universidad de los Andes, 2018)

== Awards ==
In 2014, Moraña's book Arguedas/Vargas Llosa. Dilemas y ensamblajes (Iberoamericana_Vervuert, 2013) won the Katherine Singer Kovacs Prize by the Modern Language Association (MLA). The next year, in 2015, the English translation by Andrew Ascherl, Arguedas/Vargas Llosa. Dilemmas and Assemblages (Palgrave Macmillan, 2014) won the Premio Iberoamericano Book Award by the Latin American Studies Association (LASA).

In 2003, Mabel Moraña, Enrique Dussel and Carlos A. Jáuregui won the Ford-LASA Special Project Award for their project "Coloniality at Large. Latin America and the Postcolonial Debate" which concluded in the publication of the volume Coloniality at Large. Latin America and the Postcolonial Debate (Duke University Press, 2003) with contributions from Arturo Arias, Santiago Castro-Gómez, Sara Castro-Klaren, Amaryll Chanady, Fernando Coronil, Ramón Grosfoguel, Michael Löwy, José Antonio Mazzotti, Eduardo Mendieta, Walter D. Mignolo, Mary Louise Pratt, Aníbal Quijano, Elzbieta Sklodowska, Catherine E. Walsh, among many others.

== See also ==
- Latin American studies
