= Susan Murray (historian) =

American historian

- Occupation: Historian
- Children: 2
- Awards: Katherine Singer Kovács Society for Cinema and Media Studies Book Award (2019); Guggenheim Fellowship (2021)

Academic background
- Education: University of Wisconsin–Madison; The New School for Social Research; University of Texas at Austin
- Thesis: "Hitch your antenna to the stars!": early television and the renegotiation of broadcast stardom (1999)
- Doctoral advisor: Janet Staiger

Academic work
- Discipline: Television studies
- Institutions: Brooklyn College; New York University

Susan Dorrit Murray is an American historian who specializes in television studies. A 2021 Guggenheim Fellow, she is author of Hitch Your Antenna to the Stars (2005) and Bright Signals (2018) – winning the 2019 Katherine Singer Kovács Society for Cinema and Media Studies Book Award for the latter – as well as co-editor of Reality TV: Remaking Television Culture (2004). She is Professor of Media, Culture, and Communication at the Steinhardt School of Culture, Education, and Human Development.

== Biography ==
Murray was born to Donald and Dorrit Murray. She attended the University of Wisconsin–Madison, where she got a BA in journalism in 1989; The New School for Social Research, where she got a MA in media studies in 1994; and the University of Texas at Austin, where she got a PhD in radio, television, and film in 1999. Her doctoral dissertation "Hitch your antenna to the stars!": early television and the renegotiation of broadcast stardom was supervised by Janet Staiger.

Murray originally worked at the Brooklyn College Department of Television and Radio as an assistant professor from 1999 to 2001, when she moved to New York University. She was promoted to associate professor in 2007 and full professor in 2019. She became the NYU Department of Media, Culture, and Communication's graduate studies director in 2019 and eventually department chair in 2021. She was the 2010 Wolf Visiting Professor of Television Studies at the University of Pennsylvania.

As a historian, Murray specializes in television studies. In 2004, she and Laurie Ouellette co-edited a volume on reality television, Reality TV: Remaking Television Culture. In 2005, she published Hitch Your Antenna to the Stars, a book on the rise of the television star in early television. She won the 2019 Katherine Singer Kovács Society for Cinema and Media Studies Book Award and the 2019 International Association for Media and History-Michael Nelson Book Prize for Bright Signals, a 2018 history book on color television. In 2021, she was awarded a Guggenheim Fellowship in Film, Video, & New Media Studies.

Murray has two children.

== Bibliography ==
- (co-edited with Laurie Ouellette) Reality TV: Remaking Television Culture (2004)
- Hitch Your Antenna to the Stars (2005)
- Bright Signals (2018)
