= E. Michael Gerli =

American Hispanist

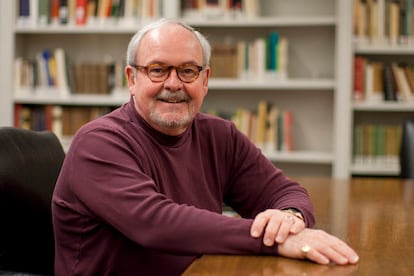
- Born: 1946 (age 79–80)
- Education: University of California, Los Angeles
- Occupations: Hispanist and cultural historian
- Notable work: Medieval Iberia: An Encyclopedia; Celestina and the Ends of Desire
- Awards: Katherine Singer Kovács Prize

E. Michael Gerli is an American Hispanist and cultural historian, known for his work on medieval and early modern Iberian literature and intellectual history, particularly on La Celestina and the works of Miguel de Cervantes.

He is Commonwealth Professor of Spanish emeritus at the University of Virginia and his research and work focuses on Medieval Hispanic philology and literature. His scholarship included sixteen authored or edited books and 200 articles and essays on Romance philology, intellectual history, and literary criticism.

He is the recipient of Modern Language Association’s Katherine Singer Kovács Prize.

== Biography ==
Gerli earned his Ph.D. in Hispanic Languages and Literatures from the University of California, Los Angeles (UCLA) in 1972. His early interest in medieval Spanish literature was shaped by formative readings of canonical texts, including La Celestina, which he first encountered at the age of 20 and would later become a focal point of his scholarly career.

Gerli has held teaching positions at Georgetown University, where he served as Chair of the Department of Spanish and Portuguese from 1982 to 1989 and 1997 to 2000 and was Andrew W. Mellon Distinguished Professor.

In 2000, he joined the University of Virginia, where he was appointed Commonwealth Professor of Spanish and Medieval Studies. He has also served as a Visiting Professor at universities such as Johns Hopkins University, Duke University, the University of Pennsylvania, Emory University, Stanford University, and the Universidad Pontificia del Perú.

Gerli has served on the editorial boards of numerous scholarly journals, including La Corónica, Hispanic Review, Anuario de Estudios Cervantinos, Journal of Hispanic Philology, Medievalia, and Convivencia. He was elected to the Modern Language Association’s Delegate Assembly and served twice as chair of the MLA Division of Medieval Hispanic Languages and Literatures.

As of 2025, Gerli teaches courses in Iberian and Latin American Cultures as a visiting professor at Stanford.

== Research and scholarly works ==
Gerli's scholarship explores the interplay between literature, language, and cultural identity in the Iberian Peninsula from the Middle Ages through the Renaissance. His research is particularly concerned with questions of authorship, literary authority, and the historical conditions of textual production and reception.

He is the general editor of Medieval Iberia: An Encyclopedia (Routledge, 2003), a comprehensive reference work that was selected as a Choice Outstanding Academic Book. Among his most influential monographs is Celestina and the Ends of Desire (University of Toronto Press, 2011), which received the Modern Language Association’s Katherine Singer Kovács Prize for an outstanding book in Latin American and Spanish literatures and cultures. In this book, Gerli interprets La Celestina through the lens of psychoanalytic and cultural theory, analyzing the workings of desire, voyeurism, and the body in the text.

His earlier work, Refiguring Authority: Reading, Writing, and Rewriting in Cervantes (1995), was awarded “Outstanding Academic Book” by the American Association of College and University Libraries, and is a widely cited study in Cervantine scholarship.

Gerli has also written on the cultural history of conversos (Jews who converted to Christianity), manuscript traditions, the development of Romance philology, and the emergence of print culture in early modern Spain.

Gerli is internationally known for his research on La Celestina (Tragicomedia de Calisto y Melibea), a foundational work of Spanish literature. He has proposed a controversial but increasingly discussed hypothesis that the original printing of Celestina may have been carried out by the Lucena sisters, members of a converso family engaged in clandestine Hebrew printing in La Puebla de Montalbán in the late 15th century. His work situates Celestina at the intersection of sexual politics, Jewish identity, and early print culture in Renaissance Spain.

== Selected publications ==
=== Books ===
- Gerli, E. Michael (2011). Celestina and the ends of desire. Toronto Buffalo, [N. Y.]: University of Toronto Press. ISBN 978-1-4426-4255-3.
- Gerli, E. Michael (2016). Reading, performing and imagining The Libro del Arcipreste. North Carolina studies on Romance languages and literatures. Chapel Hill: North Carolina Studies in the Romance Languages and Literatures, U.N.C. Department of Romance Studies. ISBN 978-1-4696-3061-8.
- Gerli, E. Michael (2019). Cervantes: Displacements, Inflections, and Transcendence. NEWARK, DE: Juan de La Cuesta. ISBN 9781588713377.
- Gerli, Michael E. (2021). Gerli, Edmondo Michael; Giles, Ryan D. (eds.). The Routledge Hispanic studies companion to medieval Iberia: unity in diversity. Routledge companions to Hispanic and Latin American studies. London New York, NY: Routledge/Taylor & Francis Group. ISBN 978-0-367-77174-4.

=== Journal articles ===
- Gerli, E. Michael (2016-04-10). "SIMONE PINET. The Task of the Cleric: Cartography, Translation, and Economics in Thirteenth-Century Iberia. Toronto: University of Toronto Press, 2016. 191 pp". Revista Canadiense de Estudios Hispánicos (in Spanish). 40 (3): 674–677. doi:10.18192/rceh.v40i3.1969. ISSN 2564-1662.
- Gerli, E. Michael (2014-12-18). "Translating Events, Glossing Experience: European Texts and American Encounters". Medievalia. 17: 39. doi:10.5565/rev/medievalia.244. ISSN 2014-8410.
- Gerli, E. Michael (2018-10-22), "«Este lunático que non cata mesura» (Libro de Alexandre 2329c): libertas inquiriendi/ vitium curiositatis, o la base científica del juicio de Dios", Aspectos actuales del hispanismo mundial, De Gruyter, pp. 185–195, doi:10.1515/9783110450828-012, ISBN 978-3-11-045082-8
- Gerli, E. Michael (2020). "A Note on the Origins and Significance of a Seventeenth-Century Castilian Rendering of the Tale of Pitas Payas". La corónica: A Journal of Medieval Hispanic Languages, Literatures, and Cultures. 49 (1): 133–157. doi:10.1353/cor.2020.0031. ISSN 1947-4261.
- Gerli, E. Michael (2021-06-01). "Julian of Toledo and Don Yllán de Toledo:". Zeitschrift für romanische Philologie. 137 (2): 362–382. doi:10.1515/zrp-2021-0015. ISSN 1865-9063.
- Gerli, E. Michael (May 2021). "'Por una gentil floresta': Invention, Discovery and Desire in a Fifteenth-Century Villancico". Bulletin of Hispanic Studies. 98 (5): 453–469. doi:10.3828/bhs.2021.26. ISSN 1475-3839.
- Gerli, E. Michael (2021). "In Toletum daemones: el deán de Santiago, don Yllán de Toledo y la ética de la sapiencia". Hispanic Review. 89 (4): 375–395. doi:10.1353/hir.2021.0027. ISSN 1553-0639.
- Gerli, E. Michael; Ruiz, Juan (May 1990). "Libro del Arcipreste (Tambien llamado 'Libro de buen amor')". Hispania. 73 (2): 413. doi:10.2307/342821. ISSN 0018-2133.

=== Book chapters ===
- Gerli, E. Michael (2015-05-01), "The Novel before the Novel in Sixteenth-Century Spain", A History of the Spanish Novel, Oxford University Press, pp. 56–78, doi:10.1093/acprof:oso/9780199641925.003.0002
- Gerli, E. Michael (2016). "Córdoba and Seville". In Wallace, D. (ed.). Europe: A Literary History, 1348-1418. Oxford University Press. ISBN 978-0-19-958002-6.
- Gerli, E. Michael (2018-12-31), "Sight, Sound, Scent, and Sense: Reading the Cancionero de Palacio", Beyond Sight, University of Toronto Press, pp. 123–140, doi:10.3138/9781487510039-009
- Gerli, E. Michael (2021-04-16), "Reflections of the long thirteenth century", The Routledge Hispanic Studies Companion to Medieval Iberia, London; New York, NY: Routledge/Taylor & Francis Group, 2021. |: Routledge, pp. 391–407, doi:10.4324/9781315210483-31, ISBN 978-1-315-21048-3
