= Queer Cinema in the World =

2016 non-fiction book by Karl Schoonover and Rosalind Galt

- Author: Rosalind Galt, Karl Schoonover
- Publisher: Duke University Press
- Publication date: 2016
- Pages: 408

Queer Cinema in the World by Karl Schoonover and Rosalind Galt is a non-fiction book about queer film studies and queer-themed films from around the world. It was published in 2016 by Duke University Press.

In 2018, it won the Katherine Singer Kovács Society for Cinema and Media Studies Book Award.
