= Roberto González Echevarría =

Cuban literary critic

- Born: 1943 (age 82–83); Sagua La Grande, Cuba
- Awards: Katherine Singer Kovacs Prize, Bryce Wood Book Award, Dave Moore Award, Premio Annual de la Crítica.

Academic background
- Education: Yale
- Thesis: Aproximación estructuralista a 'La vida es sueno,' ensayo de un método. (1970)

Academic work
- Discipline: Literary criticism of Spanish
- Institutions: Cornell, Yale

Roberto González Echevarría (born 1943) is a Cuban-born critic of Latin American literature and culture. He is the Sterling Professor of Hispanic and Comparative Literature at Yale University.

== Early life, education, and career ==
González Echevarría was born in Sagua La Grande in 1943; his family moved to Havana when he was 13, and after the Cuban Revolution, his family emigrated to Tampa in the US, where relatives on his father's side had already moved. His mother was a PhD and teacher of philosophy.

González Echevarría received his bachelor's from the University of South Florida in 1964, his master's from Indiana University in 1966, and a second master's and doctorate from Yale in 1970. After receiving his doctorate with a thesis titled 'Aproximación estructuralista a 'La vida es sueno,' ensayo de un método' , González Echevarría taught at Yale and then at Cornell (1971-1977). Since 1977, he has taught at Yale, where he was awarded the first endowed chair in Spanish (R. Selden Rose) in 1985. In 1991, he was named Bass Professor of Hispanic and Comparative Literature, and in 1995, Sterling Professor, the highest-ranking university chair at Yale.

== Awards and honors ==
His Myth and Archive won the 1989–90 MLA's Katherine Singer Kovács Prize and the Latin American Studies Association's 1992 Bryce Wood Book Award, and The Pride of Havana received the Dave Moore Award for the Best Baseball Book of 2002. His Lecturas y relecturas won the 2013 Premio Annual de la Crítica (Book Prize in Criticism) in Cuba.

González Echevarría holds honorary doctorates from Colgate University (1987), the University of South Florida (2000), and Columbia University (2002). An international symposium was held in his honor at the University of Puerto Rico at Arecibo in 2002, and an issue of Encuentro de la Cultura Cubana was published in his honor. He was elected a member of the American Academy of Arts and Sciences in 1999. In March 2011, he was awarded the National Humanities Medal of 2010 by President Obama.

== Selected works ==
- González Echevarría, Roberto "Memorias del archivo: una vida." (2022).
- González Echevarría, Roberto "Mito y archivo. Una teoría de la narrativa latinoamericana." (2019).
- González Echevarría, Roberto. The voice of the masters: writing and authority in modern latin american literature. University of Texas Press, 2010.
- González Echevarría, Roberto. Myth and archive: a theory of Latin American narrative. Duke University Press, 1998.
- González Echevarría, Roberto. The pride of Havana: A history of Cuban baseball. Oxford University Press, USA, 1999.
- González Echevarría, Roberto. Alejo Carpentier: The Pilgrim at Home. University of Texas Press, 1990.
- González Echevarría, Roberto. Love and the Law in Cervantes. Yale University Press, 2008.
