= Candace Slater =

American academic of Brazilian literature and culture

Candace Slater (born August 28, 1948) is an American academic and researcher specializing in Brazilian literature and culture.

She was born in Mineola, New York. Slater received a PhD from Stanford University. She is a professor in the Department of Spanish and Portuguese at the University of California, Berkeley. Her primary area of research has been folk and popular traditions in Brazil, in other countries in Latin America and on the Iberian Peninsula.

Slater has held fellowships from the Guggenheim Foundation, the National Endowment for the Humanities and the Tinker Foundation. She has been named by the government of Brazil to both the Order of Rio Branco and the Ordem do Mérito Cultural.

== Selected books ==
- Trail of Miracles: Stories from a Pilgrimage in Northeast Brazil (1986)
- Stories on a String: The Brazilian Literatura de Cordel (1989)
- Dance of the Dolphin: Transformation and Disenchantment in the Amazonian Imagination (1994)
- Entangled Edens: Visions of the Amazon (2003)
