= José Antonio Mazzotti =

Peruvian poet

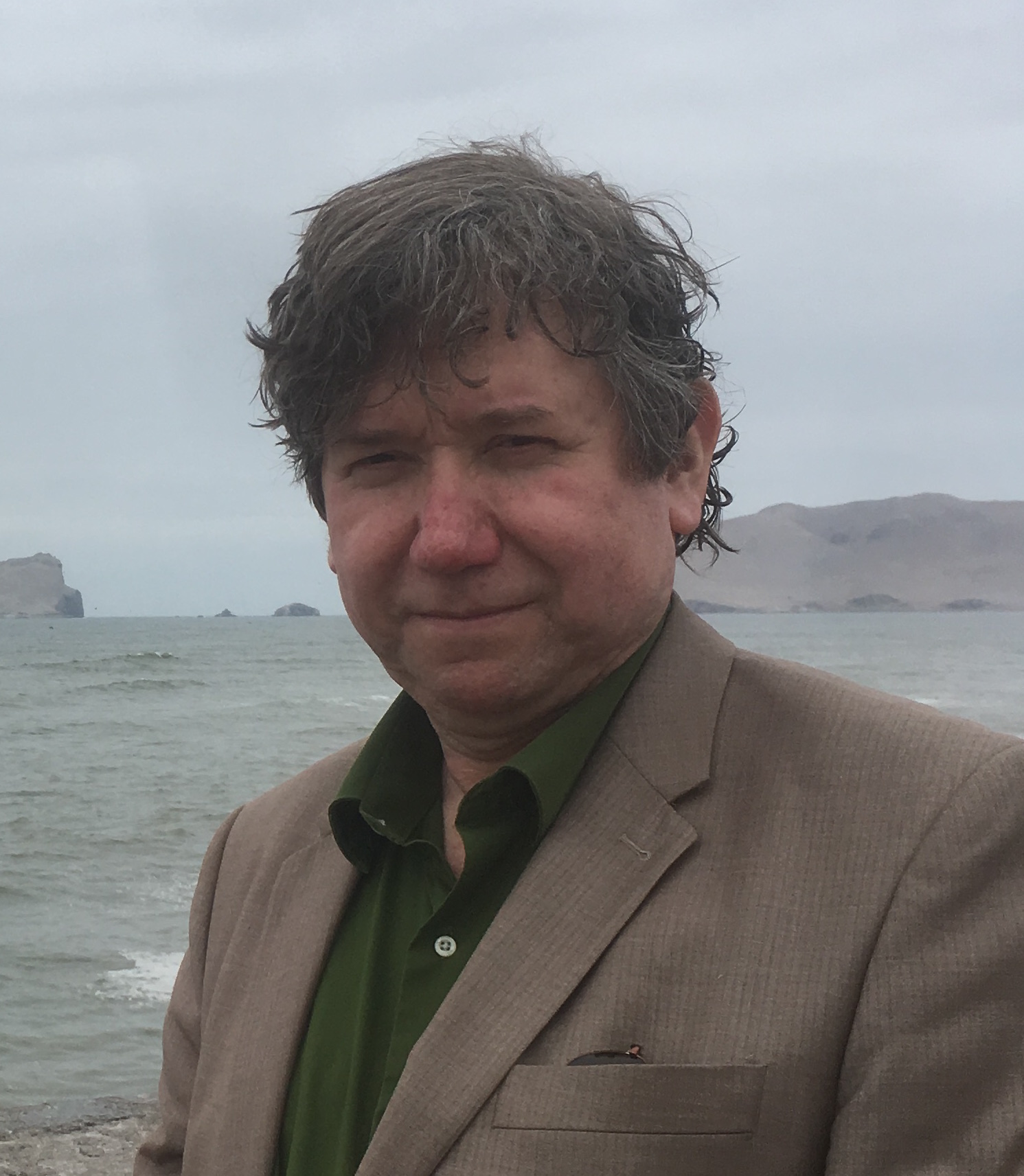
José Antonio Mazzotti

José Antonio Mazzotti (1961–2024) was a Peruvian poet, scholar, and literary activist. He was Professor of Latin American Literature and King Felipe VI of Spain Professor of Spanish Culture and Civilization in the Department of Romance Studies at Tufts University, President of the International Association of Peruvianists since 1996, and Director of the Revista de Crítica Literaria Latinoamericana since 2010. He is considered an expert in Latin American colonial literature, especially in El Inca Garcilaso de la Vega and the formation of criollo cultures, a critic of Latin American contemporary poetry, and a prominent member of the Peruvian 1980s literary generation. He received the José Lezama Lima special poetry prize from Casa de las Américas, Cuba, in 2018, for his collection El zorro y la luna. Poemas reunidos, 1981-2016.

During his early years, Mazzotti won the First Prize in the 1980 "Túpac Amaru" Poetry Contest at the Universidad Nacional Mayor de San Marcos, with Poemas no recogidos en libro (Poems Not Collected in a Book, Lima, 1981). In 1985, he published his second collection, Fierro curvo (órbita poética) (Curved Iron (poetic orbit)), and in 1988 his third book, Castillo de popa (Poop Deck), which reflects the state of mind of a wide sector of Peruvian youth at that time in the face of the difficult years of the civil war and the galloping economic deterioration of the country. The book was a finalist in the Casa de las Américas Award in Havana that same year. He has also published the poetry collections El libro de las auroras boreales (The Book of the Northern Lights, Amherst, MA, 1995), Señora de la noche (Lady of the Night, Mexico City, 1998), El Zorro y la Luna. Antología Poética 1981-1999 (The Fox and the Moon. Poetry Anthology 1981-1999, Lima, 1999), Sakra Boccata (Mexico City, 2006, and Lima, 2007, with a foreword by Raúl Zurita), Las flores del Mall (The Flowers of the Mall, Lima, 2009), Declinaciones latinas (Latin Declensions, Houston and Mexico City, 2015 ), Apu Kalypso / Palabras de la bruma (Lima, 2015), a compilation of his complete work with the same title of El Zorro y la Luna (New York, 2016), and Nawa Isko Iki / Cantos amazónicos (Lima, 2020). A bilingual version of Sakra Boccata with translations by Clayton Eshleman appeared in 2013 in Ugly Duckling Press, New York. The Fox and the Moon, a selection of his poetry in English, was published in 2018 by Axiara Editions (Oregon). He has been included in numerous Peruvian and foreign anthologies, such as the Antología general de la poesía peruana: de Vallejo a nuestros días (Lima), La mitad del cuerpo sonríe (Mexico), La letra en que nació la pena (Lima), Caudal de piedra (Mexico), Fuego abierto (Chile), Cuerpo plural (Spain), Liberation: New Works on Freedom from International Renowned Poets (USA),Volteando el siglo: 25 poetas peruanos (Cuba, 2020), etc.

== Publications (as sole author) ==
- Coros mestizos del Inca Garcilaso: resonancias andinas (1996)
- Poéticas del flujo: migración y violencia verbales en el Perú de los 80 (2002)
- Incan Insights: El Inca Garcilaso’s Hints to Andean Readers (2008)
- Encontrando un inca: ensayos escogidos sobre el Inca Garcilaso de la Vega (2016)
- Lima fundida. Épica y nación criolla en el Perú (2016)
- The Creole Invention of Peru: Ethnic Nation and Epic Poetry in Colonial Lima (2019)
- Over eighty articles on Latin American colonial literature and contemporary poetry.

=== As editor and co-editor ===
- Asedios a la heterogeneidad cultural. Libro de homenaje a Antonio Cornejo Polar (1996, co-editor, with Ulises Juan Zevallos-Aguilar).
- Agencias criollas: la ambigüedad “colonial” en las letras hispanoamericanas (2000)
- "Discurso en Loor de la Poesía". Estudio y edición, by Antonio Cornejo Polar (2000)
- Edición e interpretación de textos andinos (2000, co-editor, with Ignacio Arellano)
- The Other Latinos: Central and South Americans in the United States (2007, co-editor, with José Luis Falconi)
- Creole Subjects in the Colonial Americas: Empires, Texts, Identities (2009, co-editor, with Ralph Bauer)
- Renacimiento mestizo: los 400 años de los Comentarios reales" (2010)
- Crítica de la razón heterogénea: textos esenciales de Antonio Cornejo Polar, 2 vols." (2013)
- Argos Arequipensis: libro de homenaje a Raúl Bueno Chávez (2014)
- Memoria del Perú. Actas del VIII Congreso Internacional de Peruanistas en el Extranjero (co-editor, with Luis Abanto, 2018)
- Tradición oral iskonawa (co-editor, with Roberto Zariquiey and Carolina Rodríguez Alzza, 2018)
- Peruanismo en Burdeos: homenaje a Manuel González Prada y Bernard Lavallé. Selección del IX Congreso Internacional de Peruanistas en el Extranjero. Recherches sur le Pérou (co-edited, with Isabelle Tauzin-Castellanos, 2020)

=== Poetry ===
- Poemas no recogidos en libro (1981)
- Fierro curvo (órbita poética) (1985)
- Castillo de popa (1988 and 1991)
- El libro de las auroras boreales (1995)
- Señora de la Noche (1998)
- El zorro y la luna: antología poética 1981-1999 (1999)
- Sakra boccata (2006 and 2007)
- Las flores del Mall (2009).
- Sakra Boccata. Bilingual edition. Translated by Clayton Eshleman and with a Prologue by Raúl Zurita (2013)
- Declinaciones latinas (antología del exilio) (2015)
- Apu Kalypso / palabras de la bruma (2015)
- El zorro y la luna. Poemas reunidos, 1981-2016 (2016). Second edition, Lima, 2018 (Hipocampo Editores). Third edition, Havana, 2018 (Editorial Casa de las Américas)
- The Fox and the Moon. Selected Poems (2018)
- Nawa Isko Iki / Cantos amazónicos (2020)
