= Katherine Singer Kovács =

American film studies academic

Katherine "Kitty" Kovács
- Born: July 26, 1946; Queens, New York
- Died: May 12, 1989 (aged 42)

Academic background
- Education: Harvard University
- Thesis: Flaubert's Le rêve et la vie: a new theatrical conception (1974)

Academic work
- Discipline: Film studies, French and Latin American Literature
- Institutions: University of Southern California, Whittier College

Katherine Singer Kovács (July 26, 1946–May 12, 1989) was an American film studies academic remembered for two long-standing book awards named in her honor.

== Career ==
After being awarded a PhD from Harvard University in 1974 with the title Flaubert's Le rêve et la vie: a new theatrical conception, Kovacs worked at the University of Southern California and Whittier College. She was editor of the Quarterly Review of Film and Video up to her death from cancer in 1989. She was the first American historian of the new Spanish cinema.

Two awards were founded in her honour, the Katherine Singer Kovacs Prize award from the Modern Language Association for the best book published in Latin American and Spanish Studies and the Katherine Singer Kovács Society for Cinema and Media Studies Book Award from the Society for Cinema and Media Studies for the best book and article in film studies.

== Selected works ==
Books/Journals

Le Rêve et la Vie, A Theatrical Experiment by Gustave Flaubert, Harvard Studies in Romance Languages. French Forum Publishers, Inc., 1981.

“Militarism and War,” Humanities in Society, Vol. V, nos. 1/2, Winter/Spring, 1982.

“Contemporary Spanish Film,” The Quarterly Review of Film Studies, Vol. VII, No. 2 (Winter, 1983).

Articles

“George Méliès and the Féerie,” Cinema Journal, Vol. XVI, (Fall, 1976), 1-13. Reprinted in Films Before Griffith, John Fell, ed. University of California Press, 1983.

“Gustave Flaubert and Le Rêve et la Vie,” The Harvard Library Bulletin, Vol. XXV, 1 (January, 1977), 34-49.

“Borges on the Right,” New Boston Review, Fall, 1977, 10-12.

“A History of the Féerie,” Theatre Quarterly, Vol. VIII, no. 2 (Spring, 1978), 29-39.

“Eduardo Gudiño Kieffer, Pop Culture and Buenos Aires,” Critique, Vol. XX, No. 1 (August, 1978), 40-53.

“Pierre Louys and Luis Buñuel: Two Visions of Obscure Objects,” Cinema Journal, Vol. XIX, no. 1 (Fall, 1979), 86-98. Reprinted in Cinema Examined, Richard Dyer MacCann and Jack C. Ellis, eds., New York: E.P. Dutton, Inc., 1982, pp. 282–283.

“Miguel Littin’s Recurso del método: The Aftermath of Allende,” Film Quarterly, Vol. XXXIII, no. 2 (Spring, 1980), 22-29.

“A Propósito: Eugène Ionesco,” Suplemento cultural de La Opinion, 8 de Julio de 1980, 8-9 (interview).

“Agnes Varda en Venezia,” La Comunidad, 20 de diciembre de 1981, 15-17.

“Loss and Recuperation in The Garden of Delights,” Cine-Tracts, Vol. IV, nos. 2/3 (Summer-Fall, 1981), 45-54. Reprinted in The Anxious Subject, Moshe Lazar and Ronald Gottesman, eds. Malibu: Undena Publications, 1983, pp. 121–134.

“Militarism and War,” Humanities in Society, Vol. V, nos. 1-2 (Winter/Spring, 1982), 1-7.

“Situating Borges,” The International Fiction Review, Vol. 9, no. 2 (Summer, 1982), 123-129.

“Background on the New Spanish Cinema,” The Quarterly Review of Film Studies, Vol. VIII, no. 2 (Spring, 1983), 1-6.

“The Last Word: Buñuel’s Mon dernier soupir,” The Quarterly Review of Film Studies, Vol. VIII, no. 2 (Spring, 1983), 94-98.

“The Bureaucratization of Knowledge and Sex in Gustave Flaubert and Mario Vargas Llosa,” Comparative Literature Studies, Vol. XXI, no. 1 (Spring, 1984), 30-51.

“Latin America’s Foremothers: The House of the Spirits by Isabel Allende,” In These Times, Vol. 9, No. 31 (August 7–20, 1985), 18-19.

“Obsessed by Flaubert,” The New York Review of Books, Vol. XXXIV, No. 19, December 3, 1987, 53.

“Half of Heaven (La Mitad del Cielo),” Film Quarterly, Vol. XLI, no. 3, Spring, 1988, 34-37.

“Parody as ‘Counter-song’ in Saura and Godard,” The Quarterly Review of Film and Video, Vol. XII, nos. 1/2 (1990), 105-124.

“The Plain in Spain: Geography and National Identity in Spanish Cinema,” The Quarterly Review of Film and Video, Vol. XIII, no. 4 (1991), 17-46.
