= List of Connecticut state prisons =

This is a list of current and former state prisons in Connecticut. These prisons are overseen by the Connecticut Department of Correction.

This list does not include federal prisons located in the state of Connecticut. There are no county jails in Connecticut, all inmates are in custody of the Department of Correction. Inmate population is current as of April 2026.

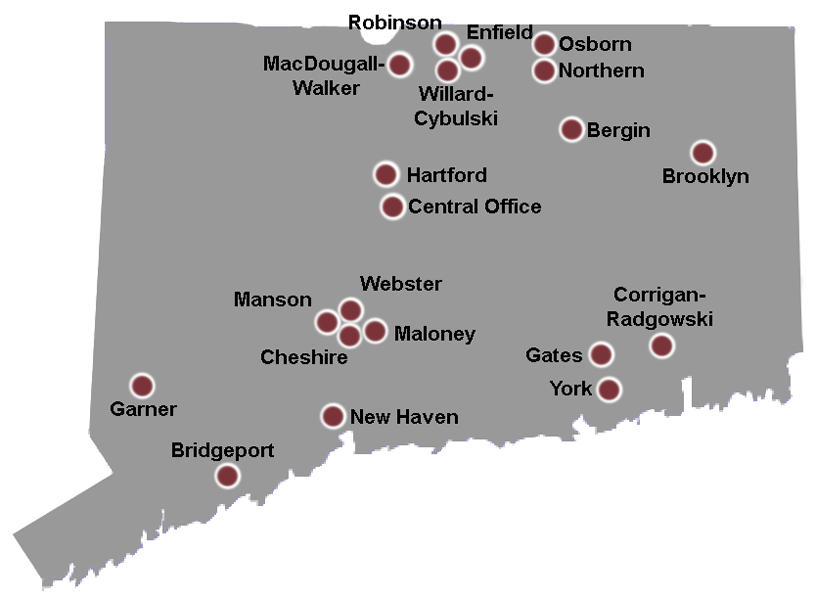
Locations in Connecticut

- Bridgeport Correctional Center (inmate population 609)
- Brooklyn Correctional Institution (inmate population 392)
- Cheshire Correctional Institution (inmate population 1179)
- Corrigan-Radgowski Correctional Center (inmate population 654) Radgowski building closed October 2021
- Garner Correctional Institution (inmate population 547)
- Hartford Correctional Center (inmate population 867)
- MacDougall-Walker Correctional Institution (inmate population 1769)
- Manson Youth Institution (inmate population 284)
- New Haven Correctional Center (inmate population 630)
- Osborn Correctional Institution (inmate population 1183)
- Robinson Correctional Institution (inmate population 1232)
- Willard-Cybulski Correctional Institution (inmate population 613) Willard building closed in 2023
- York Correctional Institution (inmate population 863)

== Closed facilities ==
- Bergin Correctional Institution (closed 2011)
- Enfield Correctional Institution (closed 2018)
- Gates Correctional Institution (closed 2011)
- Niantic Annex (closed Jan 2016)
- Northern Correctional Institution (closed June 2021)
- the colonial Old Newgate Prison (closed 1827)
- Webster Correctional Institution (closed 2010)
- Wethersfield State Prison (closed 1963)
