= Willard-Cybulski Correctional Institution =

Prison in Connecticut, United States

Coordinates: 42°01′24″N 72°30′23″W

- Interactive map of Willard-Cybulski Correctional Institution
- Location: 391 Shaker Road Enfield, Connecticut
- Status: open
- Security class: minimum
- Capacity: 1165
- Opened: 1990
- Closed: 2023
- Managed by: Connecticut Department of Correction

The Willard-Cybulski Correctional Institution is a medium-security state prison for men in Enfield, Hartford County, Connecticut, owned and operated by the Connecticut Department of Correction. It houses a maximum of 1165 inmates.

The facility is the result of a 1997 merger of two previous institutions: the Willard Correctional Institution opened 1990, and the Cybulski Correctional Institution opened 1993.

Willard-Cybulski is also one of a cluster of five state prisons in the immediate area, northeast of Enfield and under a mile from the Massachusetts state line. The others are: Robinson Correctional Institution, Enfield Correctional Institution (inmate population 717), Northern Correctional Institution, and Osborn Correctional Institution.

Governor Ned Lamont announced the closure of the Willard Correctional Institution citing an inmate decline of 44% of prisoners between 2012 and 2022.
