= Marjory Gengler =

American tennis player (born 1951)

- Full name: Marjory Logan Gengler Smith
- Country (sports): United States
- Born: May 3, 1951 (age 74)

Singles

Grand Slam singles results
- US Open: 2R (1970)

Doubles

Grand Slam doubles results
- US Open: 2R (1971)
- Education: The Bishop's School; Princeton University
- Spouse: Stan Smith
- Children: 4
- Relatives: William John Logan (grandfather); Marjorie Church Logan (grandmother)

Marjory Logan Gengler Smith (born May 3, 1951) is an American retired tennis player. In 1973, while a student at Princeton University, she was captain of the women's tennis team and led them to an undefeated season in 1972. She was the top ranked player at Princeton, the number one-ranked female player in the Eastern United States, and the first woman to be featured, as "Princeton's Best Athlete", on the cover of Princeton Alumni Weekly. In 1973, inspired by the Battle of the Sexes between Billie Jean King and Bobby Riggs, Gengler took on Jeffrey Lewis-Oakes, the top ranked men's junior varsity player, but lost the match. Gengler competed at the US Open in mixed doubles in 1971, 1973, and 1974 and in doubles in 1971, as well as singles in 1968, 1969, 1970, and 1971. She also competed at Wimbledon in mixed doubles in 1972. Gengler is married to retired professional tennis player Stan Smith.

== Early life and education ==
Marjory Logan Gengler grew up on Long Island in Locust Valley, New York. Her father, Herbert B. Gengler, was a member of the New York Stock Exchange and a partner in Gengler Brothers, a brokerage firm. Gengler has six siblings: Louise, Nancy, Jeanne, Marion, John, and Herbert. Her maternal grandfather, William John Logan, was senior vice president of Central Hanover Bank & Trust and a former football player at Princeton University. Her grandmother, Marjorie Church Logan, was murdered by a neighbor's servant.

She attended The Bishop's School, an Episcopal private school in La Jolla, San Diego.

Gengler, a member of the New York Junior Assemblies, was presented to society as a debutante at the 1969 Debutante Cotillion of the Junior League of the North Shore and at the Debutante Cotillion and Christmas Ball at the Waldorf Astoria in New York City.

After high school, she attended Princeton University, where she was a member of the university's first four-year coeducational class, graduating in 1973.

== Tennis career ==
In 1963 Gengler was the champion of the twelve-and-under category at the Junior Orange Bowl.

At Princeton, Gengler was captain of the women's tennis team in 1972 and led them to an undefeated season. She was the top ranked player at Princeton and ranked as the number one tennis player in the Eastern United States in 1973. She was the first woman to earn a white "P" sweater and to be featured on the cover of Princeton Alumni Weekly, on May 1, 1973, as "Princeton's Best Athlete."

She and her doubles partner, Helen Gourlay, were runners-up at the 1971 Pennsylvania Grass Court Championships in Haverford, Pennsylvania. Inspired by the 1973 Battle of the Sexes between Billie Jean King and Bobby Riggs, Gengler took on the top ranked men's junior-varsity tennis player, Jeffrey Lewis-Oakes, but lost the match.

While still an undergraduate student, Gengler competed at the Wimbledon in mixed doubles in 1972 and in mixed doubles and doubles the US Open in 1971, 1973, and 1974. She made it to the second round of the first qualifier for Women's Singles at the 1972 Wimbledon Championships and made it to the qualifying competition of the seventh qualifier for Women's Singles at the 1973 Wimbledon Championships.

== Personal life ==
On November 23, 1974 Gengler married professional tennis player Stan Smith, a former US Open singles champion and 1972 Wimbledon champion, at St John's of Lattingtown Episcopal Church in Lattingtown, New York.

She was a member of the New York Junior Assemblies and is on the board of the Boys & Girls Club of Hilton Head, South Carolina. She previously worked as a director of sports promotion in the New York office for Sea Pines Company.

Gengler and her husband live at Sea Pines Plantation in Hilton Head, South Carolina and have four children.
