= 2007 Cheshire, Connecticut murders =

2007 triple-murder in Cheshire, Connecticut, US

- The Petit family at Hayley's high school graduation

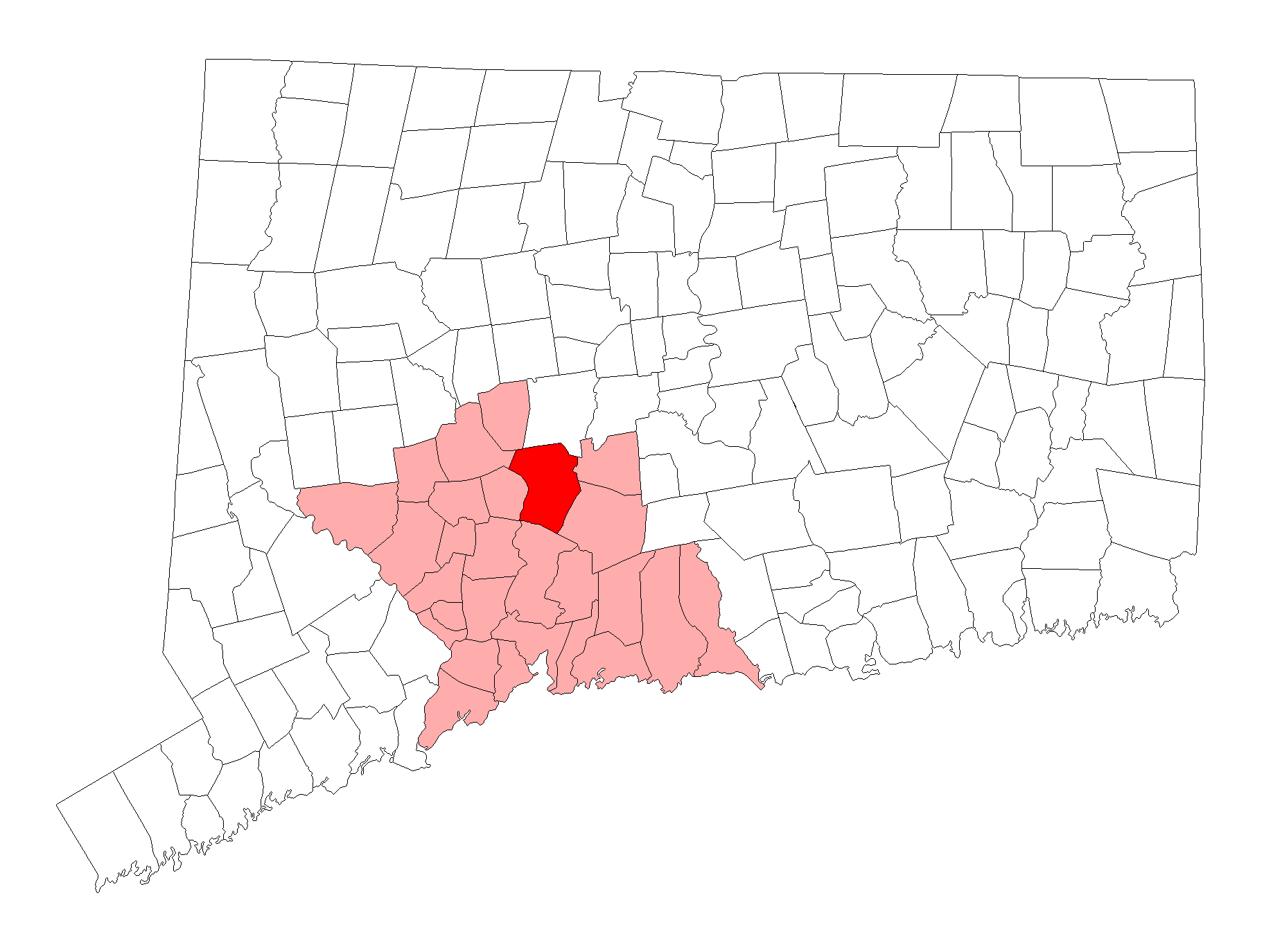
- The location of Cheshire within New Haven County, Connecticut
- Location: Cheshire, Connecticut, U.S.
- Date: July 23, 2007; 19 years ago
- Target: Petit family
- Attack type: Triple-murder, strangulation, immolation, bludgeoning, child murder, home invasion, kidnapping, child abduction, rape, child rape, arson
- Weapons: Baseball bat; Gun; Rope/restraints
- Deaths: 3
- Injuries: 1
- Perpetrators: Linda Mai Lee (born Steven Joseph Hayes); Joshua Andrew Komisarjevsky
- Motive: Unknown
- Charges: Capital murder (6 counts) (Note: Murder of multiple victims; Murder of a victim under the age of 16; Murder during the course of a kidnapping (3 counts); Murder during the course of sexual assault); Murder (3 counts); First-degree kidnapping (4 counts); First-degree sexual assault; Third-degree burglary; First-degree arson; Second-degree assault
- Sentence: Death; commuted to life imprisonment without the possibility of parole
- Verdict: Lee: Not guilty of first-degree arson Guilty on remaining charges Komisarjevsky: Guilty on all counts

On July 23, 2007, two home intruders entered the home of the Petit family in Cheshire, Connecticut, United States. The perpetrators, Linda Mai Lee (known as Steven Hayes at the time) (Note: In 2019, Lee came out as a trans woman, and began transitioning while in prison. Lee presented as male during the incident and her subsequent trial.) and Joshua Andrew Komisarjevsky, initially planned only to burgle the house, but went on to murder Jennifer Hawke-Petit and her two daughters, 17-year-old Hayley Petit and 11-year-old Michaela Petit. Their father, Dr. William Petit, managed to escape despite sustaining severe injuries.

Upon entering the Petits' home, Komisarjevsky beat William with a baseball bat, and he and Lee restrained him in the basement, along with Jennifer and her daughters. Lee later kidnapped Jennifer and forced her to withdraw money at a bank. After returning to the home, Lee raped her and strangled her to death. Komisarjevsky raped 11-year-old Michaela. The invaders then decided to burn down the house to destroy evidence. The invaders tied Hayley and Michaela to their beds, doused them and the house with gasoline, and set it on fire, leaving them to die of smoke inhalation.

The case garnered significant attention in Connecticut, with the Hartford Courant citing it as "possibly the most widely publicized crime in the state's history". The murders received national and international attention, and had a significant impact on Connecticut's death penalty, ultimately delaying its abolition.

Lee and Komisarjevsky were convicted of the murders and sentenced to death. Their sentences were vacated in August 2015, when the Connecticut Supreme Court ruled that the death penalty was unconstitutional and retroactively commuted all death sentences to life imprisonment.

== Background ==
On the evening of Sunday, July 22, 2007, 48-year-old Hawke-Petit and her daughter Michaela went to a local Stop & Shop grocery store in Cheshire, Connecticut. They picked up food for a family dinner Michaela planned to prepare. During their trip to the grocery store, Komisarjevsky noticed and took interest in them, proceeding to follow them home.

Prosecutors argued at the trial that Komisarjevsky was motivated by money and his interest in Michaela, whom he later sexually assaulted.

Shortly afterwards, Lee sent a text message to Komisarjevsky that read, "I'm chomping at the bit to get started. Need a margarita soon." Lee then texted, "We still on?" Komisarjevsky replied, "Yes." Lee's next text asked, "Soon?", to which Komisarjevsky replied: "I'm putting the kid to bed hold your horses". Lee replied: "Dude, the horses want to get loose. LOL."

== Home invasion ==
According to Lee's confession, Lee and Komisarjevsky had planned to rob the Petit house under the cover of darkness, leaving the family bound but otherwise unharmed. Both attributed the grisly outcome to a change of plan. Upon their arrival in the early hours of July 23, they found William asleep on a couch in the sun room. Komisarjevsky entered the basement through an unlocked door and took a baseball bat he found leaning on the basement stairs. Komisarjevsky then entered the sun room and used the bat to strike William four or five times. Komisarjevsky and Lee bound William's wrists and ankles with plastic zip ties and rope. William remembered one perpetrator telling the other, "If he moves, put two bullets in him." The children and their mother were then bound in their respective rooms. Lee and Komisarjevsky tied them by their wrists and ankles to their bedposts and placed pillowcases over their heads. After restraining the victims, Komisarjevsky and Lee ransacked the house for cash. They then took William to the basement, where they tied him to a support pole. Lee and Komisarjevsky continued ransacking the house for money but were not satisfied with what they found. They then found a check register with $40,000. They decided to steal $15,000.

Surveillance video from a gas station shows Lee purchasing $10 worth of gasoline in two cans that were taken from the Petit home. After returning to the house, Lee took Hawke-Petit to the bank. The prosecution later claimed that this was evidence of premeditated murder. Lee forced Hawke-Petit to withdraw $15,000 from her line of credit when the bank opened. Hawke-Petit informed the bank teller that two men were holding her family hostage in their home and threatening to kill them all. Bank surveillance cameras captured the transaction. The bank manager called 9-1-1 and reported the situation to police while Hawke-Petit was still with the teller. The manager reported to the 9-1-1 dispatcher, in real-time, as Hawke-Petit left the bank. The manager told the dispatcher that Hawke-Petit had indicated that the home invaders were "being nice" and that she believed they only wanted money. The Cheshire police responded to the bank's report by assessing the situation and setting up a vehicle perimeter, without revealing their presence.

While the police were outside the house, Lee and Komisarjevsky aggravated the nature of their crimes. Komisarjevsky sexually assaulted 11-year-old Michaela, which he later confessed to when interrogated. Evidence that Komisarjevsky raped Michaela came from her autopsy, during which State Medical Examiner Dr. Wayne Carver found his semen in her body. Komisarjevsky photographed the assault and rape on his cell phone. In his interrogation, he claimed that he believed Michaela was 14 or 16. Forensic testing results showed that there was bleach on Michaela's clothes, indicating that Komisarjevsky may have tried to eliminate DNA evidence from the assault. According to Lee' confession, Komisarjevsky provoked Lee into raping Hawke-Petit.

William was able to hear his wife's assault upstairs. He yelled up and heard one of the invaders say, "Don't worry. It's all gonna be over in a couple of minutes." William then managed to escape. He later said, "I thought, it's now or never because in my mind at that moment, I thought they were going to shoot all of us."

In confessing, Lee said that while raping Hawke-Petit on the living room floor, Komisarjevsky entered and announced that William had escaped. Lee then strangled Hawke-Petit. Lee and Komisarjevsky doused her lifeless body and parts of the house, including the daughters' bedrooms and daughters themselves, with gasoline. Investigators would later find the accelerant on the Petit sisters' beds and on the clothing they were wearing. Lee and Komisarjevsky started a fire and fled the scene. Hayley and Michaela both died of smoke inhalation. Hayley managed to escape her restraints and run out of her bedroom and into the hallway where she collapsed and died. Her body was found at the top of the staircase. Third- and fourth-degree burns on her feet indicated that she got very close to the fire around the time she died. The medical examiner who performed an autopsy on her could not determine if the burns occurred before or after her death. Michaela's body was found in her bedroom. She was still in her bed, her hands tied to it and her lower body hanging off it. Like with her older sister, Michaela's burns may have occurred while she was still alive.

William had been able to free himself of his restraints, exit the house, and crawl to a neighbor's yard for help. The neighbor initially did not recognize him due to the severity of his injuries. Meanwhile, Lee and Komisarjevsky fled the scene in the Petit family car. They were immediately spotted by police surveillance, pursued, and arrested one block away after crashing into a police car. The home invasion had lasted seven hours.

Both Lee and Komisarjevsky confessed to the murders. Detectives testified that Lee smelled of gasoline throughout her interrogation. Each assailant claimed that the other was the driving force and mastermind behind the home invasion. Komisarjevsky also blamed William for the murders. In Komisarjevsky's diary, which was later entered into evidence, he called William a "coward" and claimed that he could have saved his family if he wanted to.

== Victims ==
Hawke-Petit was a nurse and co-director of the health center at Cheshire Academy, a private boarding school in Cheshire. She met her husband at Children's Hospital of Pittsburgh in 1985, when she was a new oncology nurse and he was a third-year medical student at the University of Pittsburgh. She and Dr. Petit married in 1985.

The Petits' elder daughter, Hayley, had just graduated from Miss Porter's School, where she played varsity cross country, basketball, and crew and was a high honor roll student. While at Miss Porter's, she was elected to the senior leadership position of Athletic Association Head. She also won a school award for "exceptional community service". Hayley was scheduled to attend Dartmouth College where she wanted to study medicine. Hayley had been an active fundraiser for multiple sclerosis research, following her mother's diagnosis with that disease. She captained a Walk MS Team called Hayley's Hope.

The Petits' younger daughter, Michaela, attended the Chase Collegiate School before her death. After Hayley left for college, Michaela planned on taking over Hayley's Hope and renaming it "Michaela's Miracle". Michaela often cooked for her family and had done so the evening before the murders.

William, the sole survivor of the home invasion, was an endocrinologist in Plainville. He was also the medical director of the Joslin Diabetes Center at Connecticut's Central Hospital. He survived when he escaped via a direct external exit from the basement despite his injuries. William has not returned to his medical practice since the murders, stating his desire to be active in the foundations set up to honor the memory of his family. He contemplated running for Congress as a Republican, but later decided against it. In the following election cycle, he successfully campaigned for the Connecticut General Assembly and served as a state representative.

== Perpetrators ==
=== Linda Mai Lee ===
Linda Mai Lee
- Born: Steven Joseph Hayes; May 30, 1963 (age 63)
- Other name: Linda Hayes
- Children: 2
- Status: Incarcerated
- Penalty: Death; commuted to life imprisonment without the possibility of parole

Details
- Imprisoned at: Oregon State Penitentiary

Lee, born Steven Joseph Hayes, was first convicted for burglary in 1980 at age 16, and tried as an adult. She was paroled in 1982 but violated her parole conditions seven weeks later. During the time between this incident and the Cheshire murders, Lee was arrested nearly 30 times and spent most of this time incarcerated. Lee's last arrest before the Cheshire murders was in 2004 after she smashed a car window with a rock and stole a woman's purse. She was paroled in 2006 and was sent to the Silliman halfway house where she met Komisarjevsky.

Lee was found guilty on 16 of 17 counts related to the Cheshire murders on October 5, 2010. On November 8, 2010, the jury returned with a recommendation for her to be executed. Lee was formally sentenced to death by Superior Court Judge Jon C. Blue on December 2, 2010.

Lee was an inmate of the Connecticut Department of Correction. Subsequent to sentencing for the Petit murders, and up until August 16, 2016 (when she was transferred to a correctional facility in Pennsylvania as part of an interstate corrections compact), she was incarcerated in the Northern Correctional Institution, which housed the state's death row for men, in Somers, Connecticut. The method of execution employed by Connecticut was lethal injection, and the state execution chamber was located in the Osborn Correctional Institution in Somers. This sentence became a life sentence when the Connecticut Supreme Court vacated the sentence in 2015.

While incarcerated, Lee came out as a trans woman and began hormone therapy as part of her gender transition. In an interview in October 2019, she said she had been diagnosed with a gender identity disorder at 16, but never treated.

By 2025 she had changed her legal name from Linda Hayes to Linda Mai Lee and was imprisoned at the Oregon State Penitentiary.

=== Joshua Andrew Komisarjevsky ===
Joshua Andrew Komisarjevsky
- Born: August 10, 1980 (age 46)
- Children: 1
- Status: Incarcerated
- Penalty: Death; commuted to life imprisonment without the possibility of parole

Details
- Imprisoned at: State Correctional Institution – Mahanoy, Schuylkill County, Pennsylvania

Komisarjevsky, originally from Torrington, was Lee's co-conspirator in the home invasion and murders. He was born to a 16-year-old girl impregnated by a mechanic who was "barely out of his teens", according to adoption officials. He was adopted by Benedict Komisarjevsky, the son of theatrical director Theodore Komisarjevsky and dancer Ernestine Stodelle, and his wife Jude (née Motkya). He was sexually abused as a child, also burned and tortured.

In the early 1990s, Komisarjevsky's sister accused him of sexually assaulting her. He was convicted, and, during the penalty phase of his trial, Komisarjevsky's father conceded that it was probably true. Komisarjevsky committed his first burglary when he was 14. In 2002, he was arrested for 18 home invasions. Komisarjevsky's defense attorney at the time says that Komisarjevsky told him about every burglary he committed in perfect detail. Komisarjevsky told his attorney that, after robbing the houses, he would go to the rooms where the occupants were sleeping and listen to them breathe. He said he did this because he enjoyed the feeling of invading people's homes and violating their security. Komisarjevsky was convicted of 12 counts of burglary in December 2002. He was sentenced to nine years in prison with six years of special parole. During his sentencing hearing, Judge James Bentivegna described Komisarjevsky as a "calculated, cold-blooded predator". Komisarjevsky was paroled in April 2007. Under Connecticut law, prosecutors were supposed to send the parole board a transcript of the sentencing proceeding. But the parole board that released Komisarjevsky never received the transcript and was not aware of all the details regarding his case. After being paroled, Komisarjevsky stayed at the Silliman halfway house, where he met Lee.

Komisarjevsky remained incarcerated at the Walker Reception Center in lieu of a $15-million bond until his conviction. His trial began on September 19, 2011, and on October 13, 2011, he was convicted on all 17 counts. On December 9, 2011, the jury recommended the death penalty. On January 27, 2012, Judge Jon Blue sentenced Komisarjevsky to death by lethal injection. His sentence also was reduced to a life sentence when the Connecticut Supreme Court vacated their sentence in 2015.

As of August 16, 2016, both Lee and Komisarjevsky were transferred to separate prison facilities in Pennsylvania to serve their sentences. According to Connecticut state prison officials, the transfer was done as part of an interstate corrections compact due to reasons pertaining to "safety and security." On August 18, after being transferred, Komisarjevsky attempted to commit suicide by hanging himself.

Komisarjevsky has sought a retrial. Prior to the first trial, his attorneys were not provided with recordings that he says could have helped his case, as they were destroyed due to a lightning strike in 2010. Backups were later found in 2014 at Cheshire Town Hall. Komisarjevsky's attorneys argued that the recordings could have helped bolster their argument that the police were inadequate in their response and therefore raise questions about the credibility of their testimony. Komisarjevsky also argued that he did not receive a fair trial due to the location of the trial. Judge Jon Blue had denied a request by defense attorneys for the trial to be moved from New Haven to Stamford, as the trial venue had already been changed once because it was so notorious throughout the region. Komisarjevsky contends there was so much prejudice against him in New Haven that it was not possible for him to receive a fair trial there. In September 2019, it was revealed that the case would be heard by the Connecticut Supreme Court. The Court heard oral arguments in October 2019. On April 12, 2021, the Connecticut Supreme Court rejected Komisarjevsky's appeal in a 7-0 decision. The U.S. Supreme Court declined to hear Komisarjevsky's appeal of the Connecticut Supreme Court's decision.

== Trials ==
=== Lee's trial ===
Lee's trial began on September 13, 2010. The jury was composed of seven women and five men. Lee's defense attorneys argued that Komisarjevsky was the mastermind behind the home invasion and that he was responsible for escalating the violent nature of the crime at every critical point. Prosecutors argued that both perpetrators shared responsibility. Following the completion of the trial, the jury deliberated for about five hours and reached guilty verdicts on October 5.

The sentencing phase of the trial began on October 18, 2010, during which the jurors had to decide if Lee should be executed or imprisoned for life. Deliberations began on November 5. The first day of deliberations ended with the jury split over whether to recommend life in prison or death. The second day of these deliberations began on November 6. Defense attorney Thomas Ullman told the jury that a sentence of life in prison would be the harshest possible punishment for his client, because she was so tormented by her crimes and would be isolated in prison. "Life in prison without the possibility of release is the harshest penalty," Ullman said. "It is a fate worse than death. If you want to end [her] misery, put [her] to death. If you want [her] to suffer and carry that burden forever, the guilt, shame, and humiliation, sentence [her] to life without the possibility of release."

On November 8, 2010, the jury returned with a recommendation that she be executed. The jury recommended a death sentence on each of the six capital felony counts for which she was convicted. In the sentencing phase, the jury had deliberated for about 17 hours, over the course of four days before reaching a decision. Jurors later reported that they deliberated over a long period of time so that they could weigh all the evidence properly.

Lee had attempted to negotiate a life sentence in a plea bargain but prosecutors chose to take the case to trial so that she could get the death penalty. After the verdict, her defense attorney stated: "Hayes smiled upon hearing the jury's recommendation of a death sentence." She then added: "[Hayes] is thrilled. That's what [she]'s wanted all along." During a press conference after the verdict, Dr. Petit stated: "We all know that God will be the final arbiter and I think the defendant faces far more serious punishments from the Lord than [she] can ever face from mankind." He also spoke about his family, saying: "Michaela was an 11-year-old little girl tortured and killed in her own bedroom, surrounded by stuffed animals. Hayley had a great future. She was a strong and courageous person, and Jennifer helped so many kids."

For the first time in state history, the Connecticut state judicial branch offered post-traumatic stress assistance to jurors, who served for two months on the triple-murder trial, because they had been required to look at disturbing images and hear grisly testimony.

On December 2, 2010, Lee apologized for the pain and suffering she had caused the Petit family and added that: "Death for me will be a welcome relief and I hope it will bring some peace and comfort to those who I have hurt so much." Judge Jon Blue formally imposed six death sentences, one for each of the capital charges; Blue then added a sentence of 106 years for other crimes Lee committed during the home invasion, including kidnapping, burglary, and assault, before finishing with, "This is a terrible sentence, but is, in truth, a sentence you wrote for yourself in flames. May God have mercy on your soul." The judge also gave Hayes an official execution date of May 27, 2011; Blue said the date was a formality, because if she appealed her case, her execution could be delayed for decades. Her death sentence became a life sentence in August 2015 when the state abolished capital punishment.

=== Komisarjevsky's trial ===
Komisarjevsky's attorneys offered for him to plead guilty in exchange for a life sentence, but prosecutors took the case to trial in order to give him the death penalty. Komisarjevsky's trial began on September 19, 2011. His attorneys blamed Lee for the murders, arguing that she was the criminal mastermind, while Komisarjevsky was a confused and easily led man who did not intend to kill anyone.

Komisarjevsky was found guilty on October 13, 2011. On December 9, 2011, the jury recommended the death penalty. During the hearing, Judge Blue said "This is a terrible sentence, but it's one you wrote for yourself with deeds of unimaginable horror and savagery." Komisarjevsky made a statement during the sentencing hearing. He spoke about the shame, disappointment, and hurt he had caused, saying: "I will never find peace within. My life will be a continuation of the hurt I caused. The clock is now ticking and I owe a debt I cannot repay." Though he acknowledged taking part in the crime, he insisted that he did not intend to kill anyone, saying: "Millions have judged me guilty of capital offenses I did not commit. I did not intend for those women to die. They were never supposed to lose their lives. I don't need twelve people to tell me what I'm guilty or not guilty of. None of them were there that morning. I know my responsibilities. I will bear them as I should. What I cannot do is claim responsibility for the actions of another." He spoke about how the trial affected him, saying that he had become "quite comfortable in the face of hatred and bigotry" and said that the jury who recommended the death penalty for him "believed me so worthless even my very existence is deemed intolerable." He also said that forgiveness was not his to have, and that he needed to forgive his worst enemy – himself. During his victim impact statement, Dr. Petit described the crime as his personal holocaust and said "I have a difficult time sleeping and trusting anymore. I hope to continue to honor my family. I push forward in the hope that good will overcome evil."

Blue set July 20, 2012, as Komisarjevsky's execution date. As with Lee, Komisarjevsky's death sentence was commuted to a life sentence in August 2015.

== Subsequent developments in Connecticut capital punishment law ==
The Cheshire home invasion murders had a significant impact on Connecticut's laws regarding the death penalty and on the debate surrounding the topic. The case motivated proponents of Connecticut's death penalty and was cited as a reason that any repeal of the capital punishment in the state should not extend to those already on death row. The Hartford Courant listed the Cheshire murders and the subsequent death penalty repeal as some of the top stories that shaped the 2010s. "The Cheshire home invasion murders and the subsequent repeal of the death penalty dominated the political and criminal justice landscapes in Connecticut for the first half of the decade." The murders halted momentum to end the state's death penalty and ultimately delayed that abolition.

In 2009, the Connecticut General Assembly sent legislation to abolish the state's death penalty to Governor M. Jodi Rell ostensibly to be signed into law. However, on June 5, 2009, Rell vetoed the bill instead and cited the Cheshire murders as an exemplary reason for doing so. On November 8, 2010, Rell issued the following statement regarding the jury's recommendation of a sentence of death for Lee:

The crimes that were committed on that brutal July night were so far out of the range of normal understanding that now, more than three years later, we still find it difficult to accept that they happened in one of our communities. I have long believed that there are certain crimes so heinous, so depraved, that society is best served by imposing the ultimate sanction on the criminal. [Lee] stands convicted of such crimes – and today the jury has recommended that [she] should be subjected to the death penalty. I agree.

On April 11, 2012, the Connecticut House of Representatives voted to repeal capital punishment for future cases (leaving past death sentences in place). The Connecticut Senate had already voted for the bill, and on April 25 Governor Dan Malloy signed the bill into law. In August 2015, the Connecticut Supreme Court declared all capital punishment inconsistent with the state constitution, effectively commuting the killers' sentences to life imprisonment.

== Aftermath ==
The home invasion murders led to immediate calls for reforms to Connecticut's criminal justice system. On July 31, 2007, Governor Rell ordered electronic monitoring of paroled burglars. On September 21, she banned parole for violent offenders and ordered a review of convicts already on parole.

On July 31, Governor Rell called for a special session to consider tougher crime legislation and on August 31 she appointed a task force to examine Connecticut's criminal justice system. On January 25, 2008, Rell signed a 43-page bipartisan crime bill. Home invasion became a new class of crime which could result in a prison sentence of up to 25 years. The bill also paid for an upgrade to computer systems for law enforcement agencies.

In 2007, John Carpenter, an employee of the Chase Collegiate School, ran the New York City Marathon, raising $8,554 for the "Miles for Michaela" campaign – a scholarship benefit. The same year, Dr. Petit established the Michaela Rose Petit '14 Scholarship Fund of the Chase Collegiate School. He also established the Hayley's Hope & Michaela's Miracle MS Memorial Fund.

On January 6, 2008, over 130,000 luminaria candles were lit in front of thousands of homes across Cheshire in "Cheshire Lights of Hope", a fundraiser for multiple sclerosis and a tribute to the Petit family. Founded by a local couple, Don and Jenifer Walsh, the event raised over $100,000 for Hayley's Hope and Michaela's Miracle Memorial funds.

The murders and their aftermath were featured on the news magazine show Dateline NBC, in a segment titled "The Family on Sorghum Mill Drive", and on December 9, 2010, William Petit appeared on The Oprah Winfrey Show in a full-hour episode about the murders of his family and the work of the Petit Family Foundation.

On August 5, 2012, Petit married Christine Paluf and moved to Farmington, Connecticut. He met her when she was volunteering with the Petit Family Foundation.

HBO broadcast a documentary by filmmaker David Heilbroner called The Cheshire Murders about the murders on July 22, 2013. On August 1, 2013, Petit told station WFSB that he and Paluf were expecting a child together. The baby, who was revealed to be a boy and named William Petit III, was born on November 28, 2013. In October 2013, Petit announced that he was considering running for Congress for the Republican Party after being approached by the National Republican Congressional Committee, who had asked him if he would be interested in running. Petit ultimately decided not to be a candidate. But in May 2016, Petit announced a bid for Connecticut's 22nd House District. Petit was elected, ousting 11-term Democratic Representative Betty Boukus, and served as representative in the Connecticut House of Representatives until January 2023.

William condemned the Connecticut Supreme Court's decision to abolish the death penalty in August 2015, saying he believed the court had overstepped its powers and urging it to give greater consideration to the "emotional impact, particularly on victims and their loved ones" that death penalty cases generate. Hawke-Petit's sister Cindy Hawke Renn told NBC News that she was "disheartened" by the court's ruling.

== See also ==
- The Rising: Murder, Heartbreak, and the Power of Human Resilience in an American Town, a book written about the aftermath
- 2015 Washington, D.C., quadruple murder incident
- Logan murder
