= Geoffrey Ferguson =

American mass murderer (1950–2003)

- Born: Geoffrey Kent Ferguson; August 27, 1950; Alameda, California, U.S.
- Died: May 6, 2003 (aged 52); Garner Correctional Institution, Newtown, Connecticut, U.S.
- Cause of death: Suicide by ligature strangulation
- Convictions: First-degree murder (x5); Arson
- Penalty: Life in prison without parole

Details
- Victims: 5
- Country: United States
- State: Connecticut

Geoffrey Kent Ferguson (August 27, 1950 – May 6, 2003) was an American mass murderer who fatally shot five men following a rent dispute at his rental home in Redding, Connecticut on the evening of April 18, 1995, before setting his victims and the house on fire, marking it the largest massacre in Connecticut's history at the time. It has since been surpassed by the Hartford Distributors shooting in 2010 and the Sandy Hook Elementary School shooting in 2012.

== Early life ==
Ferguson was born on August 27, 1950, in Alameda, California, but moved across the country to Coleytown, Connecticut as a child. He later had a troubled life in his high school days. Between October and November 1966, Ferguson committed his first crimes at the age of 16. On October 31, 1966, Ferguson vandalized the Staples High School auditorium, and four days later on November 3, Ferguson stole a 17-year-old classmate's vehicle. A town crier called his pranks "the meanest trick ever", and calling the situation "malicious". Ferguson pleaded guilty and received a 60-day suspension from school for both crimes. Ferguson was sentenced to a year of probation for the vandalism, but Ferguson was later arrested and sentenced to 30 days in jail for violating the probation the following year in 1967.

He graduated from Staples in 1971 after several brushes with the law. In his later years, Ferguson was arrested again at 31 for third-degree assault and risk of injury to a minor after punching a 12-year-old boy following a prank on July 25, 1981. Officers from nearby Westport reported that the boys pranked Ferguson by bombarding his van with plastic bags filled with water. Shortly after his release, he moved to Pasquotank County, North Carolina, where he married his wife, who was an elementary school teacher working with disabled children in Elizabeth City, on December 29, 1984, before settling in nearby Powells Point, North Carolina, in December 1993. Throughout the late-1980s and early-1990s, Ferguson served as both a longtime Boy Scout leader and a self-employed handyman.

== Background ==
Prior to the massacre, Ferguson rented a single-family home that was converted into three separate apartments in the Georgetown section of Redding, Connecticut, on 166 Portland Avenue, located across the street from the Metro-North Railroad line and less than 550 feet (170 m) away from the Branchville station, with the first floor having two apartments. Later that month, the three men that lived in the upstairs unit were late paying their rent. Meanwhile, in Powells Point, Ferguson told his friend to go to the Connecticut property and collect the rent that the three men owed. The tenants told him that they would pay Ferguson the rent, but the idea angered Ferguson. Ferguson drove up to Connecticut on March 29, 1995, and showed up that evening at the apartment to evict the men before causing a big mess. Ferguson destroyed the sofa, removed all of their furniture and belongings (including a VCR and a CD player), ripped off the toilet seat, ripped the pipes off the toilet, threw the toilet, and tossed the thermostat before leaving them scattered outside the property and all over the driveway. The men arrived at the house shortly afterward and found out that the front door had been boarded shut with nailed pieces of plywood.

After calling Redding Police, determining that the men were evicted unlawfully, the men re-entered the apartment and began cleaning up their belongings. The men filed a claim in small claims court shortly afterward, as a total of over $3,000 of their belongings had been stolen from them by Ferguson. Officials also determined that the apartment had multiple building and fire code violations, stating that the men were living in unsafe conditions with a leaking roof and nonfunctional toilet, causing them to have to use an outhouse to have water or use the bathroom. Two of the men sued Ferguson for stealing $3,000 worth of their property, as well as ripping out the phone and toilet in their unit. A witness confirmed that the men had moved to the house on September 1, 1994, and Ferguson previously told them that if they caused any difficulties, he would kill them.

== Murders ==
Back in Powells Point, Ferguson was ordered to appear before the Redding Conservation Commission on April 17, 1995. Two days before the court date, police applied for a warrant for Ferguson's arrest so they could charge him with criminal lockout. That morning, Ferguson left his home and went a few miles south to neighboring Harbinger, where he rented a champagne-colored 1990 Ford Tempo from a U-Save Auto Rental. He removed the front license plate and drove straight back up to Connecticut. The next evening, one of the witnesses was watching television on his CRT TV when his screen went blank at approximately 4:00 p.m. ET. After attempting to adjust his Cablevision box, he looked out through various windows and saw Ferguson who had cut off the cable and phone lines and was walking outside the property. Ferguson then placed a ladder against the side of the building and climbed to the second floor before entering the upstairs apartment.

After getting inside, Ferguson approached 22-year-old David J. Froehlich and his friend 26-year-old David A. Gartrell, before Ferguson fatally shot them in the head. Froehlich was shot in the head twice, while Gartrell was shot in the head three times. He then placed both of the men's bodies in the bathroom, waiting for the three other men to come home. The three other men, 21-year-old Scott D. Auerbach, 22-year-old Jason M. Trusewicz, and 21-year-old Sean E. Hiltunen, had just got home from their work shifts (Hiltunen had simply tagged along to help). The men got out of their white 1986 Toyota Hilux, opened the front door, and found Ferguson pointing the gun at them, and fatally shot the three men one-by-one. Hiltunen was shot twice in the head and neck, Auerbach was shot twice in the head, and Trusewicz was shot once in the head. After murdering the five men, Ferguson poured an accelerant on four of the five male bodies before setting them and the house on fire. The other victim fell over a spiral staircase backwards and landed outside the blaze. Auerbach, who was shot in the head twice, managed to escape the flames and telling first responders that "Ferguson did it", before succumbing to his injuries shortly after arriving at a Norwalk hospital.

Ferguson immediately hopped back in his rented Tempo and took off, driving back to North Carolina. Along the way, he stopped in Elizabeth City to call his father-in-law from Hilton Head, South Carolina. He left the Outer Banks to briefly visit his father-in-law's condominium in Hilton Head for several hours, before returning to North Carolina and spending the night at a motel in Wade. The next morning, he put the front license plate back on the rental Tempo and returned the Tempo at the same dealership in Harbinger the next morning, driving a total of 1,929 miles (3,104 km) up and back over the three-day rental period.

== Victims ==
All of the victims except Gartrell were members of the Georgetown Volunteer Fire Department and had worked for a Stamford brokerage house. Gartrell was a nurseryman in neighboring Ridgefield.

== Arrest and conviction ==
On April 20, 1995, North Carolina officers arrested Ferguson at his home in Powells Point on a fugitive warrant, exactly two days after the murders. It was later confirmed that the handgun that was used in the shooting was a .22 caliber Bersa semi-automatic pistol that was owned by Ferguson. Authorities originally charged Ferguson with larceny and criminal lockout in the rent dispute, but was upgraded to five counts of first-degree murder and arson. Ferguson, who spent the first three months at the Central Prison in Raleigh, was being held in lieu of $500,000 bail for an extradition hearing, but later denied bail. During a court hearing, one of the victims' fathers explained that Ferguson was both "raging and completely out of control" when he destroyed the sofa and threw away their belongings in the Redding house. On July 20, 1995, Ferguson was extradited to Connecticut, where he was arraigned in Danbury, after a brief battle led by Superior Court Judge William C. Griffin and Ferguson's court-appointed attorney H.P. Williams Jr. of Elizabeth City.

On April 25, 1998, Ferguson pleaded guilty to all counts. Shortly before his sentencing nearly two months later on June 11, 1998, Ferguson spoke to the lyrics of "Because You Love Me" by Celine Dion while reading a writing letter from his wife, expressing her love and support for him, before being sentenced to life in prison without parole.

== Suicide ==
After his sentencing, Ferguson was transferred to the Garner Correctional Institution, in Newtown, Connecticut, where he remained incarcerated until the day of his death. In the late-night hours of May 6, 2003, Ferguson took his own life by tying a ligature around his neck and strangling himself at the age of 52. Authorities discovered Ferguson's body shortly before 3:00 a.m. the next morning at his cell, before Ferguson was taken to the Danbury Hospital where he was pronounced dead. Doctors confirmed that Ferguson died as a result of asphyxia due to ligature strangulation.

== See also ==
- List of serial killers in the United States
