= Krom Klone =

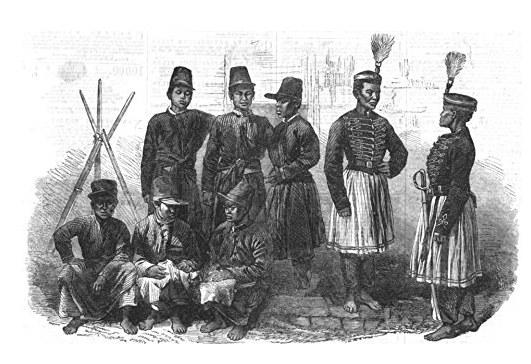
The Siamese king's bodyguard depicted in an 1866 engraving

The Krom Klone (Thai: กรมโขลน, RTGS: Kromma Khlon) were the all-female bodyguard of the King of Siam. They were established in 1688 and were a well-disciplined force, responsible for the security of the royal family and the maintenance of order within the palace grounds.

== History ==
The unit, also known as the "palace Amazons" or "the Amazon regiment", was established in 1688 to replace the 600 European mercenaries and Christian samurai troops that had previously been employed by the King of Siam. The all-women force was schooled in the use of the musket. Similar troops were used in Burma to guard the private apartments of that country's princes (foreign male troops were utilised outside of the apartments).

The duties of the regiment were to keep order in the palace grounds (in which role Salmonson regards them as "fierce") and to protect the lives of the king and those of his wives and family. Michael Smithies describes them as a "police force ... who were drilled like soldiers" and had responsibility for the maintenance of order among the 3-9,000 residents of the palace. The unit was to also brought into action during revolts if the regular Siamese army had failed to contain the threat. The unit accompanied the king on all occasions including hunting and riding.

== Organisation, arms and uniform ==
An 1888 wire article in the New Zealand newspaper the Otago Witness provides detailed information on the organisation, arms and uniform of the force. It cites an interview in England with a brother of King Chulalongkorn that the unit comprised 400 women, divided into four companies of 100 with new entrants, selected for their beauty and strength, being accepted from the age of 13 and retired to a reserve at the age of 25. The reserve troops were used to guard the palaces and crown lands, while the main bodyguard protected the king's person. Entrants were required to take a vow of chastity, with an exception being made if any were selected to become a wife of the king. Each member of the unit was allocated five black female servants, to allow her to devote herself entirely to her duties. In regular duty, each member was equipped with a musket, but was also trained to use a pistol. Training was carried out for two days each week on a training ground in the capital, with the king and his brother attending once a month to award prizes to the best performing soldiers.

The Otago Witness described a dress uniform comprising a gold-embroidered white knee-length woolen robe over which was worn a light mail coat and gilt cuirass. A gilt helmet was also worn and the full-dress weapon was a lance. A second uniform is described in a 1984 edition of Sawaddi magazine and comprised blue pantaloons (chong kraben) with white jackets and cream scarves.

== Ma Ying Taphan ==
The head of the bodyguard was discussed in Anna Leonowens' 1873 book The Romance of the Harem, where she was named Ma Ying Taphan "The Great Mother of War". Steven Erlanger describes the book as "full of historical errors" and "a novel built on a fabrication" driven by a need to publish rather than by the author's experiences at the Siamese court. This work, which has been repeated by later reports such as a 1921 Pittsburgh newspaper article, ascribes to the commander a judicial role over offences committed by members of the king's harem. She was said to hold court in a hall from which a trapdoor opened directly into the palace dungeon and was permitted to sentence offenders to flogging, torture on the rack, flaying alive and burning alive.
