= Chase Collegiate School =

School in Waterbury, Connecticut, US

Location
- 565 Chase Parkway; Waterbury, Connecticut 06708; United States; 41°32′51″N 73°03′59″W

Information
- Funding type: Private
- Motto: Cease not to learn until thou cease to live
- Religious affiliation: Nonsectarian
- Founded: 1865 (Collegiate); 1912 (McTernan), 1972 (unified school)
- Closed: 2020
- Locale: Midsize suburb
- CEEB code: 070850
- NCES School ID: 00233283
- Teaching staff: 45.3 (FTE)
- Grades: Pre-K – 12
- Gender: Co-educational
- Enrollment: 402 (2013-2014)
- Student to teacher ratio: 8.6
- Campus size: 47 acres (190,000 m^{2})
- Colors: Green and white
- Nickname: Highlanders
- Yearbook: Salmagundi
- Endowment: $13,340,132.33
- Tuition: $6,400–$16,900 (Pre-K); $19,900–$35,900 (K–12) (as of 2014)
- Website: www.chasecollegiate.org

Chase Collegiate School was a nonsectarian private day school offering education for children from pre-kindergarten through grade 12. The school was on a 47-acre (190,000 m^{2}) campus in Waterbury, Connecticut. Due to the COVID-19 pandemic, the school announced its closure on August 13, 2020.

As of 2015, the enrollment was 276 students: 61 Lower School (age 3 pre-kindergarten through 5th grade), 75 Middle School (6th through 8th grades), and 140 Upper School (high school).

== History ==
Chase was a co-educational school formed by the merger of two single-sex schools. The first was a girls' school established in 1865 as Collegiate Institute for Young Ladies, later St. Margaret's School for Girls. The second was a boys' school established in 1912 as the McTernan School for Boys. Upon merging in 1972, the combined school was called St. Margaret's-McTernan. The unified name was meant to appeal to both school communities.

Circa 2004-2005 a "School Name Committee" was determining whether to and how to change the school's name. The school leadership wanted a name that showed secularism as the school was at that point secular. The institution was renamed to Chase Collegiate School in 2005. All members of the school's board of trustees had voted to rename the school.

On October 2, 2017, the school announced that it had been purchased by York Education Group, a for-profit entity which owns multiple schools.

The school closed in August 2020 before the 2020-2021 school year could begin, during the COVID-19 pandemic in Connecticut. The school stated that the pandemic caused the closure. By 2021 the campus was sold to Area Cooperative Educational Services (ACES), an organization that operates magnet schools

. ACES operates "ACES at Chase" at the former Chase Collegiate campus.

== Notable alumni ==
- Diana Muldaur - actress, former board member of the Screen Actors Guild and first female president of the Academy of Television Arts & Sciences
- Grant Goodeve - television actor
- Steven Erlanger - journalist
- Joan Bennett - actress
- Lucia Chase - founding patron of the American Ballet Theatre
- Jayne Meadows - stage, film, and television actress
- Gene Tierney - actress (attended St. Margaret's School for Girls)
- Michaela Petit - victim of the Cheshire murders
