= Wearsafe =

Wearsafe is an American personal safety company located in Hartford, CT. Their primary wearable technology is a device that uses bluetooth technology to connect a button-like Tag with a smartphone app. When pressed, the Tag alerts a user's selected network of the location of the emergency, as well as sending a live audio feed of the incident to a group chat function.

== History ==
Wearsafe was created in response to the Cheshire Home Invasion Murders of 2007. The founders, David Benoit and Phillip Giancarlo, began work on the technology in 2011 with copatent providers Rick Borden, Kyle Busque and Keven Busque.

== Products ==
=== Tag ===
The Wearsafe Tag is a small, wearable button that operates similarly to other wearable personal safety devices: by connecting to a smartphone. The device also works without a smartphone, but is limited to 200 ft (70 m) from the location. According to the Boston Globe, "Activating the Wearsafe tag not only triggers a set of alerts sent to a designated list of contacts, but sends live location information and audio from the scene and opens a 'virtual situation room' between respondents in order to coordinate help (or call 911). The 'Rewind' function [plays] audio recorded in the 60 seconds prior to activation to provide context. Whatever action taken on a call for distress, the tag vibrates the reassure the caller that help is on the way: The Wearsafe Tag buffers live audio whenever it is turned on.

=== App ===
Wearsafe's Tag pairs with a mobile app to connect with the user's selected network. The Wearsafe Tag sends GPS coordinates and audio context to a prearranged network set up through the app.

The app provides reassurance to the victim that help is on the way-- which Secret Service Agents, Navy SEALS, and CIA Agents "pointed out that people who have reassurance that help is on the way have a much, much higher probability of a successful outcome in a stressful situation."
