= Emanuel Lovell Webb =

American serial killer (born 1966)

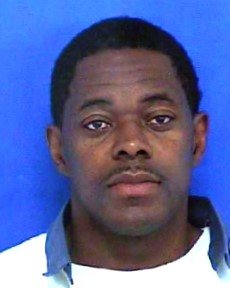
- Born: April 9, 1966 (age 60); Georgia, U.S.
- Other names: The East End Killer; The Bridgeport Killer; The Bridgeport Strangler
- Status: Incarcerated
- Convictions: Georgia; Involuntary manslaughter Robbery; Theft of a motor vehicle Connecticut; Murder (3 counts)
- Penalty: Georgia; 20 years imprisonment (1994); Connecticut; 60 years imprisonment (2008)

Details
- Victims: 5 (4 convictions)
- Span of crimes: April 1, 1990 – July 11, 1994
- Country: United States
- States: Connecticut and Georgia
- Date apprehended: November 2005
- Imprisoned at: MacDougall-Walker Correctional Institution

Emanuel Lovell Webb (born April 9, 1966), known as The East End Killer, is an American serial killer who raped and killed four women in Bridgeport, Connecticut, from 1990 to 1993. After the murders were connected and a search for the killer was underway, Webb moved to Georgia, where he raped and killed a woman in Vidalia in 1994. He was convicted of that murder and sentenced to 20 years in prison, being paroled in 2001. He was detained for a parole violation in 2005 and afterwards DNA evidence linked him to the Bridgeport murders. He was extradited to Connecticut and pleaded no contest in 2008 and was sentenced to 60 years in prison.

== Murders ==
=== East End Killer ===
On April 1, 1990, law enforcement responded to an apparent arson in downtown Bridgeport. The crime in question was a sports car that was parked on a city street, and the fire department, after putting the fire out, discovered the charred remains of a woman in the passenger seat. The woman, later identified as 30-year-old Sharon Cunningham, was revealed to have been strangled by a strand of cloth wrapped around her neck. DNA from a male was discovered on her body, leading authorities to suspect she had also been raped.

The next attack linked to the killer was on March 28, 1992, when police responded to a call of a possible homicide in a house on Webster Street. In the home, police discovered the partially-clothed body of 29-year-old Minnie Sutton lying in her living room riddled with stab wounds. An autopsy disclosed she had been stabbed in the forehead, neck, chest, and around her stomach, with signs of strangulation also found on her neck. Her 3-year-old son was present during this time although the killer did not harm him. Similar to Cunningham's murder, Sutton had been raped, and a cigarette butt containing male DNA was found near her body.

The third victim was Elizabeth "Maxine" Gandy, a 33-year-old woman who went missing on Easter 1993. Her body was found lying topless in a pool hall in an abandoned building, with her pants unfastened in the front indicating sexual assault was the motive. Authorities ruled that a hunk of wood that laid near her body had been the murder weapon. Signs of a struggle between Gandy and her killer were present as blood was splattered on the nearby walls and DNA from a male was found under her fingernails.

The killer struck for the final time in June 1993. On June 28, the father and a friend of 29-year-old Sheila Etheridge entered her apartment after not hearing from her for a few days only to discover her body lying in her bedroom. An autopsy concluded she had likely been sexually assaulted, and a beer can that lied near her body contained male DNA.

=== Evelyn Charity ===
On July 11, 1994, 36-year-old Evelyn Charity was discovered dead in her home in Vidalia, Georgia. She had been fatally strangled and stabbed, her home had been ransacked, and her Chevrolet Camaro was stolen. Not long after, police arrested Webb, then 28 years old and a construction worker, who had moved to Georgia from Connecticut just a year prior. Webb was found in possession of Charity's vehicle and confessed to killing her, but claimed he accidentally strangled to her to death during a consensual sex act, and only stabbed her and ransacked the house to make it look like a failed robbery. Later that year, Webb pleaded guilty to charges of involuntary manslaughter, robbery and motor vehicle theft, and was given a 20-year sentence. He was paroled after only seven years in late 2001.

== Investigation and arrest ==
While Bridgeport authorities conclusively linked the East End Killer to four murders, they investigated up to fifteen other murders dating back to the 1980s as possibly being linked to the case. In the late 1990s, a cold case unit took over the investigation, and they sent the physical evidence to the Connecticut State Police Forensic Science Laboratory for examination, but this failed to turn up any results. In 2000, the DNA found on Gandy's body was sent to the Federal Bureau of Investigation (FBI) so that the samples could be compared with DNA profiles of convicted felons around the country.

In November 2005, Webb was detained for drug possession and failing to disclose his residency change after he moved back to Connecticut, which violated his parole conditions and thus he was sentenced to serve a brief sentence in Charlton County and was required to submit a sample of his DNA into a database. In early 2006, investigators with the East End Killer case were notified when the DNA they submitted matched the sample Webb gave up.

Along with the physical evidence linking him to Gandy's murder, investigators noted circumstantial evidence that linked Webb to the other deaths. At the time of the East End murders, Webb lived in Bridgeport with his sister, whose apartment was within the 10-block radius where the murders occurred. He was employed as a security guard in the neighboring town of Fairfield until moving to Georgia in August 1993, and afterwards, the murders appeared to have ceased.

When examining records of Webb's movements during the murders, detectives discovered hospital records that revealed he had checked into a hospital for serious cuts to his hand on April 20, 1993, the day after Gandy was killed. The male DNA found under Gandy's fingernails indicate she fought with her attacker and may have caused him serious harm.

== Convictions ==
Webb was extradited to Connecticut in February 2007 and charged with Gandy's murder. At his first court appearance on February 15, his bail was set at $4 million. His attorney's attempt to lower his $4 million bail to $1 million was struck down. That same month, Webb's DNA was matched to forensic evidence left at the other three murder scenes, and thus he was charged with three additional murders. He initially spoke little to authorities and offered to plead no contest to all charges, allowing him to avoid admitting or denying the charges. In May 2008, the charges against Webb in the Etheridge case were dropped, but the case was nonetheless closed due to the DNA evidence. Later that month, Webb was convicted and sentenced to 60 years in prison. He was then returned to Georgia, where he was imprisoned until 2014 for violating his parole. As of 2026, Webb is incarcerated at the MacDougall-Walker Correctional Institution in Suffield. Should he live long enough, he is scheduled for release on November 18, 2058.

== See also ==
- List of serial killers in the United States
