= Corrigan-Radgowski Correctional Center =

Prison in Montville, Connecticut, US

Coordinates: 41°27′05″N 72°06′27″W

- Interactive map of Corrigan-Radgowski Correctional Center
- Location: 986 Norwich-New London Turnpike Uncasville, Connecticut
- Status: open
- Security class: mixed
- Capacity: 1586
- Opened: 1994
- Managed by: Connecticut Department of Correction

The Corrigan-Radgowski Correctional Center is a Level 3 & 4 high-security prison with two facilities for male offenders, in the Uncasville section of Montville, Connecticut. The prison was opened on December 30, 1994. It is a part of the Connecticut Department of Correction.

The Corrigan Correctional Institution and the Radgowski Correctional Institution were merged in 2001 as the Corrigan-Radgowski Correctional Center. This facility, named after two DOC employees, Raymond L. Corrigan and Stanley J. Radgowski Jr., incarcerates both pretrial and sentenced criminals. The superior courts of Danielson, New London, Norwich, and Windham use this facility.

The primary Inmates Population consists of (as of January 1, 2014):

- Accused: 365
- Sentenced: 1,221
- Total: 1,586

The Radgowski Annex Building, which first opened in 1957, has a capacity of 257 prisoners. It temporarily closed in 1991 but reopened in 1997. In 2017 Governor of Connecticut Dan Malloy announced that the annex would close due to a lack of prisoners resulting from a lowered crime rate, with the annex officially having been closed on Oct. 6th, 2021. Gov Ned Lamont announced Sept. 8th 2021, that the prison itself would close by the end of 2021 due to an overall declining inmate population. However, the prison is still open and operating as of November 2025.

On June 11th 2026, the Connecticut Department of Correction reported an inmate death at the prison. At least 10 other inmate deaths have occurred in the state from January 1st to April 17th of 2026.

Inmate deaths in Connecticut are conducted and/or overseen by the state’s Office of Inspector General. In the event that an investigation into the death of an inmate shows evidence of criminal conduct, the Inspector General may refer the matter to the applicable State’s Attorney’s Office.
