= Old Bluff Presbyterian Church =

Historic church in North Carolina, United States

- U.S. National Register of Historic Places
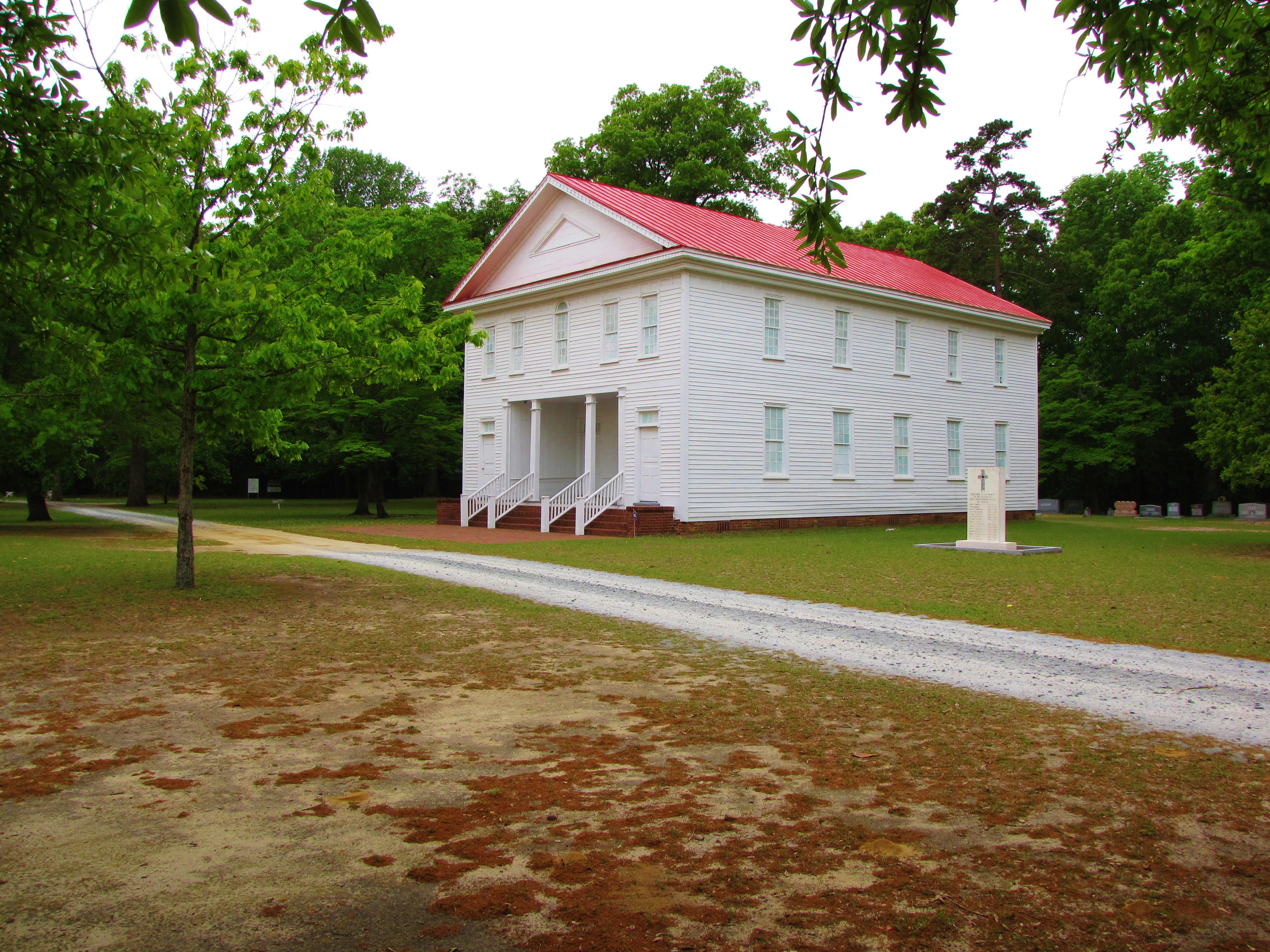

- Location within North Carolina Location within the United States
- Location: 4100 Old Bluff Rd, Godwin, NC 28344
- Coordinates: 35°11′2″N 78°43′25″W
- Area: 9.5 acres (3.8 ha)
- Built: 1858
- Architectural style: Greek Revival
- NRHP reference No.: 74001345
- Added to NRHP: August 7, 1974

Old Bluff Presbyterian Church is a historic Presbyterian church located near Wade, Cumberland County, North Carolina.

The church congregation was founded in 1758. Later its pastor was the Rev. John McLeod, who came from the Isle of Skye, Scotland, in 1770. He was accompanied by many families of Highland Scots. In 1858 the congregation dedicated a new church building constructed in the Greek Revival style.

The church is a plain, weatherboarded building with details that appear to be neoclassical moldings, including drill work suggesting triglyphs, dentils, and egg-and-dart, on the frieze and pediment. It is a large Greek Revival style temple form building. It features a two-story, five-bay tetrastyle porch in antis.

It was listed on the National Register of Historic Places in 1974.
