= Garner Correctional Institution =

Prison in Newtown, Connecticut

- Interactive map of Garner Correctional Institution
- Location: Newtown, Connecticut; 41°23′58″N 73°16′18″W
- Status: Open
- Security class: Level 4 (High)
- Capacity: 593
- Opened: 1992
- Managed by: Connecticut, Department of Correction
- Warden: Jeanette Maldonado

Garner Correctional Institution is a high-security state prison for men in Newtown, Connecticut. It was built in 1992 and began housing inmates later that year. The facility holds both pre-trial defendants and sentenced offenders, and serves as the Department of Correction's dedicated mental health facility for adult male inmates requiring significant psychiatric treatment.

== History ==
In the late 1980s, Connecticut faced significant prison overcrowding due to rising incarceration rates. To relieve pressure on existing facilities, such as Bridgeport and Cheshire, the Department of Correction launched an expansion program that included the construction of Garner Correctional Institution.

The prison was established in 1992 on land that had previously belonged to the Fairfield Hills Hospital campus. It is named in honor of Ward A. Garner, who served as warden of the Wethersfield State Prison from 1911 to 1918.

== Incidents ==
On March 25, 2018, inmate J’Allen Jones died following a confrontation with correctional officers at the facility. His death was ruled a homicide, and despite the state’s attempts to have the case dismissed, a wrongful-death lawsuit remains ongoing.

On May 25, 2019, correctional officer Christopher Byars stabbed inmate Justin Mustafa in the hand with a key during an altercation. Mustafa subsequently filed a federal civil rights lawsuit alleging excessive force. In October 2024, Mustafa was awarded monetary damages for the assault.

In August 2023, inmate Joe Baltas stabbed two officers using a sharpened toothbrush. Both officers were transported to a local hospital for treatment of their injuries and later released.

Between July and August 2024, Garner CI experienced three inmate deaths in less than a month, prompting investigations by the Department of Correction and state police.

== Notable inmates ==
- Richard Crafts - convicted in 1989 of murdering his wife, Helle Crafts, in Newtown, in what became known as the “woodchipper murder.”
- Geoffrey Kent Ferguson - former landlord convicted in 1998 of the 1995 murders of five men in Redding over a bounced rent check, committed suicide at Garner in 2003.
- Philip Giordano - former mayor of Waterbury, convicted in 2003 of sexually abusing two young girls while in office.
- Michael Skakel - nephew of Ethel Kennedy, convicted in 2002 of the 1975 murder of his Greenwich neighbor Martha Moxley.
- Tyree L. Smith - sentenced in 2013 for killing and cannibalizing Angel Gonzalez in Bridgeport, earning him the moniker “Connecticut Cannibal.”
