= Robinson Correctional Institution =

Prison in Connecticut, United States

Coordinates: 42°01′04″N 72°30′59″W

- Interactive map of Robinson Correctional Institution
- Location: 285 Shaker Road Enfield, Connecticut
- Status: open
- Security class: medium
- Capacity: 1473
- Opened: 1985
- Managed by: Connecticut Department of Correction
- Director: Warden Zelynette Caron

The Carl Robinson Correctional Institution is a Connecticut Department of Correction state prison for men located in Enfield, Connecticut. The facility was opened in 1985 for medium-security inmates with a capacity of 880.

Robinson is one of a cluster of five state prisons in the immediate area, northeast of Enfield and under a mile from the Massachusetts state line. The others are Enfield Correctional Institution (inmate population 717), Willard-Cybulski Correctional Institution, Northern Correctional Institution, and Osborn Correctional Institution. It was announced in 2017 that the Enfield Correctional Institute would close in early 2018 due to reduced inmate population statewide; most staff members in the staff of 190 were reassigned.

Robinson was the scene of two escapes in 1990, an extensive prison riot in June 1990, when 300 to 400 inmates set fire to the mess hall and gymnasium, and a worse riot on July 12, 1994. Members of the "20 Love" gangs from Hartford and New Haven clashed with Bridgeport gangs over the use of washing machines. The fight escalated and resulted in two inmate deaths, 35 detainees injured, two correctional officers injured, and all six of Robinson's dorm buildings under control of inmates for at least an hour. Overcrowding 1075 prisoners into a facility built for 880 was identified as a contributing factor.
