= Arthur G. Elvin =

American mechinical engineer and politician (1865–1934)

1st Mayor of Flower Hill, New York
- In office May – September 1931
- Preceded by: None (position established)
- Succeeded by: William John Logan

Personal details
- Born: 1865 Peru, Indiana, U.S.
- Died: October 12, 1934 (aged 69) Munsey Park, New York, U.S.
- Spouse: Sue Jamison (died 1931)
- Children: 1

Arthur G. Elvin (1865 – October 12, 1934) was an American mechanical engineer, inventor, and politician who served as Mayor of the Villages of Plandome and Flower Hill, New York.

== Life and career ==
Elvin was born in Peru, Indiana in 1865. He began working when he was aged 16 in a railroad shop in Indiana, employed as a machinist. He eventually became the Chesapeake and Ohio Railroad's superintendent of motive power, during which time he resided in Huntington, West Virginia. He then relocated to Montreal to serve in the same capacity for the Grand Trunk Railroad, prior to relocating again to Scranton, Pennsylvania to hold the same position with the Delaware, Lackawanna, and Western Railroad. Then, in 1904, relocated to Franklin, Pennsylvania, where he became the head of the Franklin Railway Supply Company's mechanical engineering department.

Elvin was the inventor of (and held patents for) several railway devices, such as the Elvin automatic stoker and the Elvin grate-shaker, and was a key figure in the development of several pneumatic freight devices, such as those used for conveyors and elevators; he was also involved in the creation of the Franklin fire door for locomotives and was a member of the American Society of Mechanical Engineers.

He eventually moved onto Long Island, New York, where he would be a founding member of the First National Bank of Manhasset and enter politics.

=== Political career ===
Elvin served as Mayor of the Incorporated Village of Plandome during the 1920s. He then served as the 1st Mayor of the Incorporated Village of Flower Hill between May and September 1931, stepping down from the post shortly after the death of his wife; the Mayorship was subsequently given to William John Logan. Shortly afterwards, Elvin moved to adjacent Munsey Park.

=== Personal life ===
Elvin was married to Sue Jamison Elvin, who died in 1931. The couple had one daughter.

Elvin owned a winter home in Fort Worth, Texas.

== Death ==
Elvin died from heart failure on October 12, 1934, at his summer home on Abbey Road in Munsey Park, New York. He is buried at Christ Church Cemetery in Manhasset.

Elvin was survived by his daughter, E.R. Lederer (née Elvin), who resided in Fort Worth, Texas.
