= D.C. mansion murders =

2015 mass murder in Washington, D.C.

Coordinates: 38.92688°N 77.06373°W

- Location: Woodley Park, Washington, D.C., U.S.
- Date: May 13–14, 2015
- Target: Savopoulos family
- Attack type: Mass murder, arson
- Weapons: Knife, blunt object, fire by arson
- Deaths: 4
- Convicted: Daron Wint

On May 14, 2015, three members of the Savopoulos family—Savvas, Amy, and their son Philip—as well as their housekeeper, Veralicia Figueroa, were killed at the Savopoulos home in Washington, D.C. The victims were held hostage for 19 hours, starting on May 13. Ten-year-old Philip was tortured in order to coerce $40,000 in cash from the family. The perpetrator(s) restrained them with duct tape before killing them, then set the house on fire. They all sustained blunt force trauma, and Philip was also stabbed.

On October 25, 2018, the defendant Daron Wint, a welder fired from a company owned by Savvas Savopoulos, was found guilty of 20 counts of kidnapping, extortion, and murder. He was sentenced to four consecutive life sentences.

== Robbery and murder ==
The perpetrators stole $40,000 (equivalent to $54,000 in 2025) in cash from the family after an assistant, Jordan Wallace, delivered it to the house. They also stole the family's blue Porsche, which was later found burned in a church parking lot in Maryland.

On May 14, 2015, the Savopoulos house in Northwest Washington was spotted ablaze and firefighters were called. They discovered the three bodies of the Savopoulos family and their housekeeper. The police determined the fire was intentionally set, and the victims had blunt-force and stab wounds, leading them to label the deaths homicides.

== Victims ==
The Savopouloses were a prominent, upper-class family in the Woodley Park neighborhood of Northwest Washington. Savvas Savopoulos was the CEO and president of American Iron Works, a construction company that played a role in building the Verizon Center. Savopoulos helped fund the National Child Research Center and served on its board. The family were active parishioners of Saint Sophia Greek Orthodox Cathedral.

The slain victims were:

- Savvas Phillip Savopoulos, age 46, Amy Clare's husband
- Amy Clare Savopoulos (née Martin), age 47, Savvas's wife
- Philip Savvas Savopoulos, age 10, their son
- Veralicia Figueroa, age 57, their housekeeper

Two teenage daughters, Abigail and Katerina Savopoulos, were not present at the scene when the four were killed, as they were away at boarding school.

== Perpetrator ==
Daron Dylon Wint (born November 27, 1980) was identified by police as the prime suspect in the case. He was found by matching his DNA to that found on the crust of a Domino's pizza delivered to the house on May 13, while the family was apparently captive. He was a certified welder who formerly worked at American Iron Works, leading police to believe the murders weren't random.

Wint is originally from Guyana and immigrated to the U.S. in 2000. He was a United States Marine Corps recruit but was discharged before his training was complete for medical reasons. He had a long rap sheet of criminal charges; he was convicted in 2009 of second-degree assault in Maryland and sentenced to 30 days in jail, and also pleaded guilty to the crime of malicious destruction of property in 2010 as part of a plea deal, in which a second charge, burglary, was dropped. He has also been charged in the past with theft, assault, a sexual offense, and weapons possession.

After Wint's DNA was matched, a warrant was issued for his arrest on a charge of first-degree murder. Wint was found and arrested on May 21, 2015, in northeast Washington DC, a week after the murders, and was subsequently charged with first-degree murder.

Prosecutors believed Wint had help killing the victims and did not act alone, but Wint was the only person charged in the deaths.

== Reactions ==
Attorney Robin Ficker said that Wint did not seem violent when he defended him in earlier cases. "My impression of him—I remember him rather well—is that he wouldn't hurt a fly. He's a very nice person," Ficker said. He then characterized Wint as "kind and gentle" and added that authorities have arrested "the wrong guy" in the Savopoulos case, claiming, "They've made a big mistake here." Ficker also said that Wint's family had told him "that he doesn't like pizza and never eats pizza", referring to the matching of Wint's DNA to that found on a pizza crust at the crime scene.

== Trial ==
The trial date for Daron Wint was set on February 3, 2017, to begin September 4, 2018. The trial began with opening statements on September 11, 2018.

During the trial, Wint admitted that he had been present at the crime scene when the murders occurred but claimed the true perpetrators of the crime were his two brothers, Darrell and Steffon Wint, who he alleged committed the murders without his knowledge or participation. Wint claimed he had gone to the mansion with his brothers under the impression he would be assisting them with a drywall and painting job and had left when he realised they intended to rob the Savoupouloses. He admitted leaving his DNA on a pizza which he said was offered to him by Darrell. In rebuttal to the defense case, the prosecution called a witness who testified that Darrell had been in Gaithersburg, Maryland on May 13, when the victims were taken captive.

Two witnesses testified to seeing Wint enter the Savopoulos house at around 12:10 pm on May 14, shortly before the fire started, and others recalled seeing him near the woods where the family Porsche was burned shortly before it was recovered. Wint's DNA was found on a knife left at the crime scene as well as on the pizza crust which had first led to his identification. The prosecution also presented samples of hair found in the bedroom and garage at the Savopoulos home, which forensics matched to Wint's DNA profile; however the prosecution's expert witness admitted that the hair could have belonged to Steffon Wint.

On October 25, 2018, Wint was found guilty of 20 counts of kidnapping, extortion, and murder. He was sentenced to four life terms in prison without the possibility of parole in February 2019.

Wint appealed his conviction in December 2020, seeking a new trial on the grounds that the judge improperly blocked his lawyers from calling an additional witness whom he claimed would show that Darrell had not been in Gaithersburg on 13 May. On December 15, 2022, the D.C. Court of Appeals largely affirmed Wint's conviction and denied Wint a new trial. The appeals court noted that Wint was improperly denied the opportunity to introduce some exculpatory evidence, but it did not reverse the trial results in light of "the overwhelming weight of other evidence against appellant."

== See also ==
- Cheshire, Connecticut, home invasion murders
- Crime in Washington, D.C.
- Logan murder – Murder of Marjorie Church Logan in 1946
