= Francis Clifford Smith =

American prisoner (1924–2026)

- Smith in 1950
- Born: September 1, 1924; Stamford, Connecticut, U.S.
- Died: June 25, 2026 (aged 101); Rocky Hill, Connecticut, U.S.
- Known for: Longest-serving prisoner in U.S. history
- Status: Deceased
- Conviction: First-degree murder

Details
- Date: July 1949
- Country: United States
- State: Connecticut

Francis Clifford Smith (September 1, 1924 – June 25, 2026) was an American convicted murderer who was believed to be the longest-serving inmate in United States history. He was sentenced to death for the murder of a nightwatchman during a robbery at a yacht club in July 1949; his sentence was commuted to life in prison in 1954. Smith maintained innocence his entire life. He had several brief stints outside of prison, including a two-week escape in 1967 and spending 10 months out on parole in 1975. However, after returning to prison, Smith remained an inmate until July 2020, when he was paroled and moved to a nursing home, remaining on supervised parole until his death in 2026.

== Early life ==
Smith was born on September 1, 1924, in Stamford, Connecticut, and grew up in Darien. He was the son of a roofer. Smith was involved in petty crimes and, at age 10 or 11, he was sent to a reform school. He later went to a juvenile detention center. In January 1942, at age 17, he received an indefinite sentence to a reformatory in Cheshire for three counts of breaking into a gas station. Smith and a cellmate later escaped after attacking a guard and stole a car, which they drove to the house of a relative of Smith, from which they stole two revolvers. They were caught attempting to rob a store and afterwards sentenced to two to nine years in the state prison. Smith was paroled in early 1949.

== Murder of Grover Hart ==
On July 23, 1949, during a robbery at the Indian Harbor Yacht Club in Greenwich, a 68-year-old nightwatchman, Grover Hart, was shot and later died of his wounds. Before he died, Hart described the two men who were robbing the club and mentioned that one of them wore a face covering. Wearing a face covering was something that Smith sometimes did. A day later, police discovered a gray Cadillac at a New York cafe, in which there were the items stolen from the club, the gun used to shoot Hart, and a shirt that included the name "Smith" along with the address of his parents' house. The cafe owner also stated that Smith was one of two men who had been using the vehicle.

After a search, Smith was captured in the woods, in possession of hair dye. During an interrogation, he told police to find George Lowden, whom he had been imprisoned with for a time. Lowden was arrested at his house and had what was alleged to be a watch from the club. Lowden declared Smith to be the one who fatally shot Hart while saying that he himself only "fired once in the air", and took up an offer to testify against Smith in exchange for avoiding the death penalty. Lowden's girlfriend, Edith Springer, also said she had seen Smith use the Cadillac in which the gun was found.

However, at Smith's trial in 1950, Lowden was unwilling to testify against Smith and said that his earlier statement "was taken under third degree (Note: Meaning that torture was used to get him to confess.) and there isn't a bit of truth in it". The Hartford Courant noted, "When the judge told [the prosecutor] he could not provide the jury with the dozen or so [pages] remaining on a copy of the statement Lowden had repudiated, the prosecutor read it to the jury, repeatedly, by incorporating its contents in questions that Lowden wouldn't answer." Lowden's girlfriend, in her testimony at the trial, described details about the Cadillac she had been unable to recall the prior year before a grand jury, including numbers on different license plates which were the same as those found on stolen plates in the vehicle. Nevertheless, on June 7, 1950, Smith was convicted of first-degree murder and sentenced to death by the electric chair. At the trial, and throughout his life, Smith always maintained that he was innocent; The Boston Globe, in 2023, described it as "really, the only thing he ever talks about".

== Imprisonment ==
Smith was granted a reprieve from his scheduled execution eight times. In October 1951, shortly before Smith was to be executed, Springer admitted that her testimony had been false and "nothing I said was true", which led to Smith's seventh reprieve. Later, in February 1953, David Blumetti, a convicted robber who had once been imprisoned with Smith in Connecticut, and who was actively serving a prison sentence in Alabama, said that he had murdered Hart, and not Smith. Blumetti claimed that "Smith was supposed to have been involved, but backed out", and that the Cadillac in which the weapon was found was loaned to Blumetti and Lowden by Smith. However, the prosecution responded that "Blumetti was lying ... to get out of 15 years of solitary confinement in Alabama" and only confessed to the murder so that he could be imprisoned in Connecticut.

Smith was scheduled to be executed, for the eighth time, on June 7, 1954. Hours before the scheduled execution, Leo Carroll, who had interrogated Smith and led the murder investigation, went to the state pardons board and implored them to spare Smith, declaring "I'm positive he didn't kill Grover Hart. I'm not even sure he was present at the murder." The board then decided to commute his sentence to life in prison, two hours before he was to be executed.

Smith made numerous appeals requesting a new trial. The Globe noted that he "focused all of his attention on proving his innocence. He stole legal books from the library and hid them in his cell. He filed appeal after appeal. He wrote out, longhand, a book-length petition for a new trial." However, his requests were rejected, and the judge, in declining them, said that Blumetti was "unworthy of credit" and Springer of "degraded character", and thus not valid in supporting a new trial.

While in prison at the Enfield Correctional Institution, Smith worked as an auto mechanic, carpenter, clerk, and window washer. In May 1967, he escaped by driving away in a truck. Two weeks later, he was caught in Winthrop, Massachusetts, and returned to Enfield. In 1974, he was let out of prison for one day for Christmas Eve, and in 1975, he was paroled, but then returned to prison following 10 months for violating the conditions of his parole. After a last parole hearing in 1976, Smith gave up seeking parole. He was later held at the Osborn Correctional Institution. He was nicknamed "The Birdman of Osborn" there as he was known for taking bread to feed to birds.

In 2012, Smith was noticed by an official for the state board of pardons and offered a parole hearing, but declined. After declining offers several times, he applied for it in 2020 and was paroled on July 7, 2020, and released to 60 West, a nursing facility in Rocky Hill, Connecticut, for those who were incarcerated. In total, Smith's prison service for the murder of Hart spanned 70 years and 31 days. He is believed to be the longest-serving inmate in United States history. He had dementia in his last years. Smith died in his sleep on June 25, 2026, at the age of 101, and was cremated. His death was publicly announced over a month later.
