= Coleytown, Connecticut =

Census-designated place in Connecticut, United States

- Census-designated place
- Location within Connecticut Location within the United States
- Coordinates: 41°10′34″N 73°20′52″W
- Country: United States
- State: Connecticut
- County: Fairfield
- Town: Westport

Area
  - Total: 3.70 sq mi (9.59 km^{2})
  - Land: 3.69 sq mi (9.57 km^{2})
  - Water: 0.0077 sq mi (0.02 km^{2})
- Elevation: 70 ft (21 m)
- Time zone: UTC-5 (Eastern (EST))
  - Summer (DST): UTC-4 (EDT)
- ZIP Code: 06880 (Westport)
- Area codes: 203/475
- FIPS code: 09-16085
- GNIS feature ID: 2805087

Coleytown is a census-designated place (CDP) in the town of Westport, Fairfield County, Connecticut, United States. It occupies the northeastern corner of the town and is bordered to the north by the town of Weston and to the east by the town of Fairfield. As of the 2020 census, Coleytown had a population of 3,522.

== Demographics ==
=== 2020 census ===
Coleytown was first listed as a CDP prior to the 2020 census.

As of the 2020 census, Coleytown had a population of 3,522. The median age was 45.7 years. 26.6% of residents were under the age of 18 and 17.0% of residents were 65 years of age or older. For every 100 females there were 90.1 males, and for every 100 females age 18 and over there were 88.5 males age 18 and over.

100.0% of residents lived in urban areas, while 0.0% lived in rural areas.

There were 1,137 households in Coleytown, of which 45.4% had children under the age of 18 living in them. Of all households, 75.0% were married-couple households, 7.0% were households with a male householder and no spouse or partner present, and 15.8% were households with a female householder and no spouse or partner present. About 11.1% of all households were made up of individuals and 7.3% had someone living alone who was 65 years of age or older.

There were 1,229 housing units, of which 7.5% were vacant. The homeowner vacancy rate was 1.8% and the rental vacancy rate was 13.9%.

Racial composition as of the 2020 census
Race	Number	Percent
White	2,858	81.1%
Black or African American	36	1.0%
American Indian and Alaska Native	1	0.0%
Asian	248	7.0%
Native Hawaiian and Other Pacific Islander	0	0.0%
Some other race	55	1.6%
Two or more races	324	9.2%
Hispanic or Latino (of any race)	226	6.4%

== Notable people ==
- Geoffrey Kent Ferguson - American mass murderer who killed five men in Redding, Connecticut over a rental dispute in 1995, grew up in Coleytown
