= Lorne J. Acquin =

American mass murderer

- Born: Lorne Joe Acquin; March 21, 1950; Canada
- Died: June 20, 2015 (aged 65); MacDougall-Walker Correctional Institution, Suffield, Connecticut, United States
- Convictions: Murder (9 counts); First degree arson
- Penalty: 105 years to life in prison

Details
- Date: July 22, 1977; 2:30 a.m. – 3:30 a.m.
- Locations: Prospect, Connecticut
- Target: Foster brother's family
- Killed: 9
- Weapons: Tire iron; Lug wrench; Knife

Lorne Joe Acquin (March 21, 1950 – June 2015) was a Canadian-American mass murderer who killed his foster brother's wife, her seven children, and their niece in their home at Cedar Hill Drive in Prospect, Connecticut, on July 22, 1977, by beating them to death with a tire iron. He afterward set fire to the building and escaped, but was arrested the following day and sentenced to 105 years in prison two years later.

It was the largest mass murder in Connecticut history until the Sandy Hook Elementary School shooting.

== Murders ==
On Friday, July 22, 1977, Lorne Acquin went to the home of his foster brother Fred Beaudoin, who was at work at the time, and killed the latter's wife Cheryl, their seven children, and a niece of theirs by bludgeoning them to death with a tire iron. Acquin also sexually molested one of the children, 10-year-old Sharon Lee Beaudoin, before killing her. He afterward spread gasoline around the house, set it on fire, and escaped.

The charred body of Cheryl Beaudoin was later found on the kitchen floor, while the bodies of three children were found in one bedroom, and two more children in another. One further child was found dead in the master bedroom and two more bodies were found in the bathroom. Several of the children, as well as Cheryl Beaudoin, had their hands tied behind their backs. Two of the other children's feet were tied together. All of the children appeared to have head wounds.

Within 24 hours, police interviewed more than a hundred witnesses, including Fred Beaudoin and Lorne J. Acquin. The following Sunday night, Acquin agreed to make a statement to police in which he admitted to attacking his sister-in-law and the children. Later that day, he was charged with nine counts of murder and one count of arson.

The Supreme Court of Connecticut described the murders as "brutal and apparently motiveless". Prosecutors, however, speculated that Acquin's motivation may have stemmed from the sexual assault of one of the children. Prosecutors speculated that Cheryl may have caught Acquin molesting one of her daughters and, out of fear that she would press charges, Acquin decide to murder the whole family before that could happen.

== Victims ==
- Cheryl Beaudoin, age 29
- Frederick Beaudoin, 12
- Sharon Lee Beaudoin, 10
- Debra Ann Beaudoin, 9
- Paul Beaudoin, 8
- Roderick Beaudoin, 6
- Holly Lyn Beaudoin, 5
- Mary Lou Beaudoin, 4
- Jennifer Santoro, 6

== Trial and conviction ==
Acquin went to trial on July 16, 1979. He was sentenced to 25 years to life on each murder conviction and 20 years for arson. He served his sentence in MacDougall-Walker Correctional Institution until his June 2015 death from a severe brain bleed at the UConn Health Center in Farmington.

== Bibliography ==
- Lane, Brian & Gregg, Wilfred: The Encyclopedia of Mass Murder – A Chilling Collection of Mass Murder Cases; Carroll & Graf Publishers, New York, United States, 2004. ISBN 978-0786713561
- Richards, Cara Elizabeth: The Loss of Innocents: Child Killers and Their Victims; Rowman & Littlefield, 2000. ISBN 9780842026031
