= MacDougall-Walker Correctional Institution =

Prison in Connecticut, United States

Coordinates: 41.95032°N 72.63746°W

- Interactive map of MacDougall-Walker Correctional Institution
- Location: 1153 East Street South Suffield, Connecticut
- Status: Open
- Security class: Mixed
- Capacity: 2049
- Opened: 2001
- Managed by: Connecticut Department of Correction
- Warden: Jesus Guadarrama

The MacDougall-Walker Correctional Institution is a Level 4 & 5 (high & maximum) security level multi-mission facility for adult males, in Suffield, Connecticut. Based on its inmate population, it is the largest correctional facility in New England. It came into being on May 15, 2001, as the result of the merger of the Walker Reception and Special Management Unit and the MacDougall Correctional Institution. Combined the facility resides on 140 acres.

The Staff & Inmates Population consists of (as of January 1, 2013):

- Accused: 264
- Sentenced: 1,785
- Total: 2,049
- Staff: 678

== Notable Inmates ==
- Lorne J. Acquin - Mass Murderer.
- Richard Crafts - Woodchipper Murderer.
- Emanuel Lovell Webb - Serial killer known as the "East End Killer".
- Jesse Velez - Pedophile featured on Hansen vs Predator.
