= William John Logan =

American football player, banker, and politician

2nd Mayor of Flower Hill, New York
- In office 1931-1937
- Preceded by: Arthur G. Elvin
- Succeeded by: Stephen H. Mason

Personal details
- Born: August 2, 1891 New York City, U.S.
- Died: August 29, 1977 (aged 86) Middleburg, Virginia, U.S.
- Spouse: Marjorie Church Logan (died 1946)
- Children: Marjory Jeanne Logan
- Education: Princeton University
- Occupation: Banker, politician
- Known for: American football, banking, politics

William John Logan (August 2, 1891 — August 29, 1977) was an American football player and banker, as well as a politician who served as the 2nd Mayor of Flower Hill, New York.

== Life and career ==
Logan was raised in Brooklyn, New York, and attended Princeton University. In college, Logan played football for the Princeton Tigers and was a consensus first-team selection on the 1912 College Football All-America Team. He graduated from Princeton as part of the Class of 1913. He served with the United States Military between 1916 and 1918.

Logan later became a banker who served as senior vice president of Central Hanover Bank & Trust, a director of the War Production Board during World War II and director-general of the Allied Joint Export Import Agency in post-war Germany. He received the U.S. Army's Exceptional Civilian Service Award for his post-war efforts in laying the foundation for export programs in Germany and Japan that "sharply reduced their requirements for American assistance and materially increased their capacities for self support."

In July 1946, his wife, Marjorie Church Logan, was murdered in their Flower Hill estate, and the ensuing trial drew extensive coverage in the New York press.

In his later years, Logan lived in Middleburg, Virginia.

=== Political career ===
Logan served as the 2nd Mayor of Flower Hill, New York, succeeding Arthur G. Elvin; Logan held that office between 1931 and 1937.

== Death ==
Logan died in Middleburg, Virginia on August 29, 1977, at the age of 86.
