= Murder in Connecticut law =

Aspect of Connecticut criminal law

Murder in Connecticut is defined as the intentional killing, under circumstances defined by law, of people within or under the jurisdiction of the U.S. state of Connecticut. The United States Centers for Disease Control and Prevention reported that in the year 2021, the state had a murder rate somewhat below the median for the entire country.

== Definitions ==
=== Murder ===
Connecticut has four homicide offenses in total, including the two types of murder. Standard murder is defined as when a person, with intent to cause the death of another person, causes the death of such person or of a third person, or causes a suicide by force, duress, or deception. It is punishable by a minimum of 25 years in prison and a maximum of 60 years in prison.

==== Felony murder rule ====
Connecticut's felony murder rule is defined as when a victim dies as the result of a perpetration of a violent felony, regardless of intent to kill. Felony murder is punished as the crime of standard murder.

=== Murder with special circumstances ===
The most serious form of homicide in Connecticut is murder with special circumstances. Murder with special circumstances constitutes the crime of murder with one of the following circumstances present:

- The victim was a member of the state police, local police, a chief inspector or inspector in the Division of Criminal Justice, a state marshal, a judicial marshal, a constable, a special policeman, a conservation officer, an employee of the Department of Corrections, or any firefighter.
- The murder was the result of a contract killing.
- The murder was committed by someone previously convicted of murder.
- The murder was committed by someone who at the time of the murder was serving a life sentence.
- The murder was committed by a kidnapper either during the course of the kidnapping or prior to the return of the victim.
- The murder was committed during the course of a rape.
- The murder of two or more persons at the single time or in the course of a single criminal transaction.
- The victim was under the age of 16.

Murder with special circumstances is punished only by life imprisonment without the possibility of parole. The death penalty is not an option since Connecticut abolished the death penalty in 2012.

== Penalties ==
The sentences for homicide offenses in Connecticut are listed below.

Offense	Mandatory sentence
Criminally negligent homicide	Up to 1 year in jail
Second-degree manslaughter	Up to 10 years in prison
First-degree manslaughter	1 to 40 years in prison
Murder	25 to 60 years in prison (eligible for parole if the defendant was under the age of 25)
Murder with special circumstances	Life imprisonment without the possibility of parole (juveniles cannot be charged with murder with special circumstances)

== See also ==
- Capital punishment in Connecticut
