= Logan murder =

Murder of Marjorie Church Logan in 1946

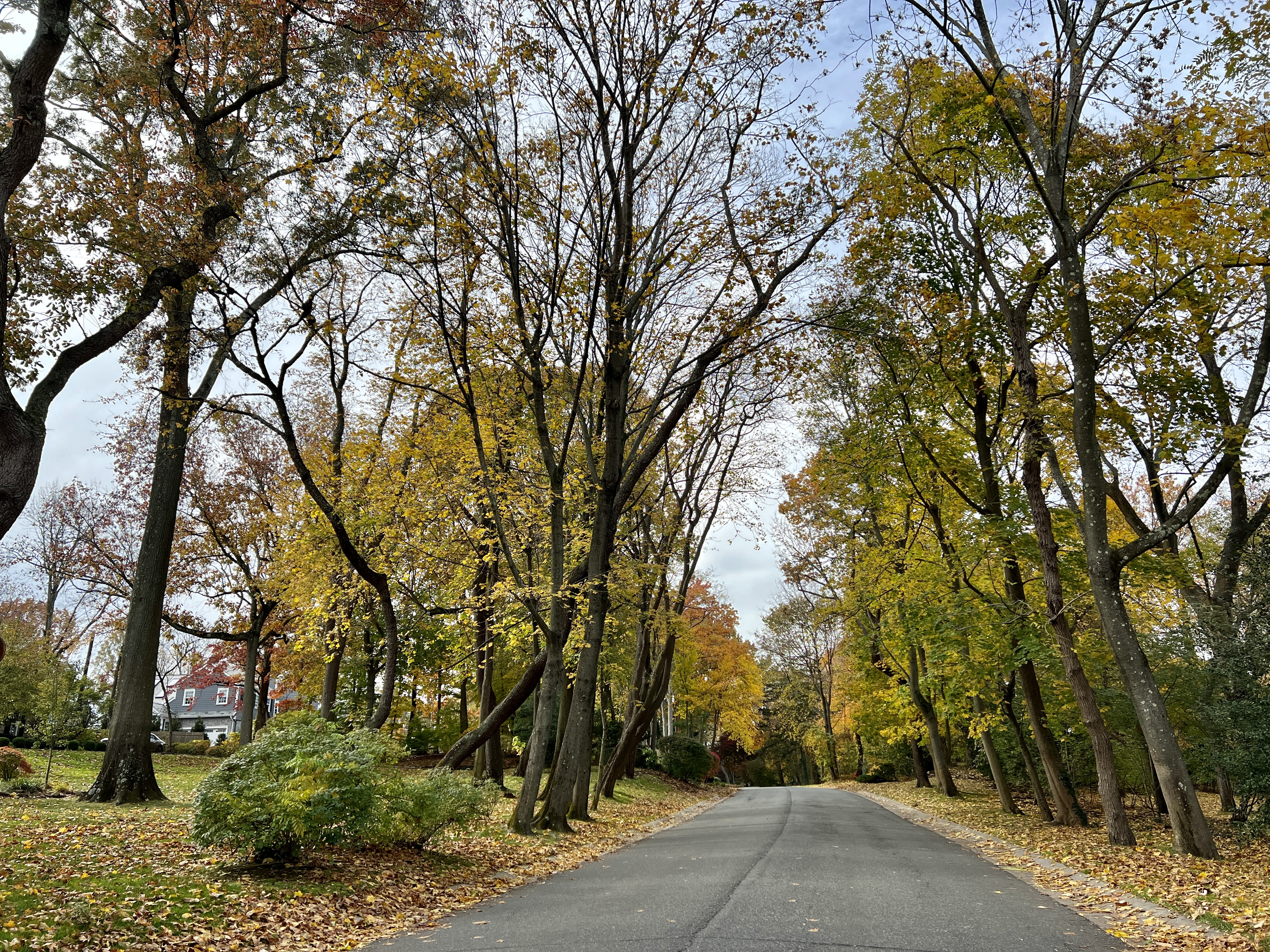
- Bonnie Heights Road in 2021
- Location: Bonnie Heights Road; Flower Hill, New York, United States
- Date: 24 July 1946; 80 years ago (US Eastern time (UTC−05:00))
- Attack type: Shooting with handgun; rape
- Deaths: 1
- Injuries: 1
- Victims: Marjorie Church Logan; Marjorie Jeanne Logan
- Perpetrator: Ward Beecher Caraway

On July 24, 1946, Marjorie Church Logan, the wife of prominent banker and local politician William John Logan, was fatally shot at the family's estate on Bonnie Heights Road in Flower Hill, New York during a home invasion, prior to their daughter, Marjory Jeanne Logan, being shot twice and raped.

The murder-rape, along with the associated trial, received significant attention and coverage from the media – including from Newsday and The New York Times.

== Description ==
=== Background ===
During the morning hours on July 24, 1946, the Logan estate, located on Bonnie Heights Road in the Incorporated Village of Flower Hill, was broken into by 22-year-old Ward Beecher Caraway, who worked as a butler and chauffeur at another Flower Hill estate, located on Greenbriar Lane. Soon after entering the home, Caraway confronted Marjorie Church Logan in the living room and demanded that she give him money, then fatally shot her. Caraway then exited the living room and went upstairs, where he shot twice and raped Marjory Jeanne Logan in her bedroom, severely injuring her.

Marjory Jeanne Logan, although severely wounded from the assault and rape, escaped the house through the back door, where painter Theodore Click, who was doing work at a neighboring home, heard her crying for help. Click quickly transported her to receive medical assistance. Despite the extent of her injuries, Marjory Jeanne Logan made a full recovery.

=== Investigation and manhunt ===
Caraway fled the crime scene before the Nassau County Police Department and detectives were able to arrive at the scene. An intense manhunt quickly ensued, during which roughly 200 potential suspects were interviewed and found to have had no involvement. Caraway, on August 2, eventually confessed to his role in the murder and rape – a week after he committed the crimes, for which he was then charged. During his interview with the police and detectives, Caraway also showed the authorities where he fled, and where he disassembled the gun which he used, a .32 caliber revolver.

=== Trial and conviction ===
During a dramatic trial in court, Caraway was convicted of first degree murder and sentenced to death. He also admitted to being high on drugs at the time of the crimes. Caraway was sent Sing Sing Prison in the Town of Ossining, New York, where he was executed on the evening of July 3, 1947, in the state's electric chair.

== See also ==
- Cheshire murders
- List of people executed in New York
- List of people executed in the United States in 1947
- 2015 Washington, D.C., quadruple murder incident
