= York Correctional Institution =

Women's prison in Connecticut, United States

- Interactive map of York Correctional Institution
- Location: 201 W Main Street Niantic, Connecticut; 41°19′23″N 72°14′14″W
- Status: open
- Security class: mixed
- Capacity: 1151
- Opened: 1918; 108 years ago; reopened October 1994; 32 years ago
- Managed by: Connecticut Department of Correction

Janet S. York Correctional Institution is Connecticut's only state prison for women, located in Niantic. The facility opened in its current form in October, 1994, and houses a maximum of 1500 at a range of security levels from minimum to super maximum.

The site was first founded in 1918 as the Connecticut State Farm and Reformatory for Women. As of 1930, the facility had expanded, and was renamed the Niantic Correctional Institution. It composes of a minimum side and maximum side. Average age of women is 35.

== History ==
=== Founding ===
Throughout the 1800s in Connecticut, women who committed crimes were imprisoned at the same prisons as men--Old Newgate Prison in Granby and the State Prison in Wethersfield—and kept separate from the male prisoners. In 1911, the Connecticut Prison Association proposed creating a commission to study establishing a reformatory for women, an effort that was supported by suffragists and members of the Daughters of the American Revolution. It was not until 1917 that the General Assembly approved a bill to establish the Connecticut State Farm and Reformatory for Women. According to the law, the site had to be at least 200 acres, with woodland, tillable pasture, and a natural water supply. It also had to be close to a railroad. The law also stipulated that girls aged sixteen years and over could be committed to the State Farm for up to three years.

In July 1917, Governor Marcus H. Holcomb appointed a commission to select a site, construct buildings, and start the State Farm. The committee selected a location of 700 acres surrounding Bridge Lake in East Lyme, Connecticut. Existing houses and farm buildings were renovated for the new facility.

=== Early years ===
The Connecticut State Farm and Reformatory for Women opened in 1918, with 12 inmates. It was a working farm, and the incarcerated women worked on the farm and engaged in recreational activities, such as square dancing and hobby classes; they also had the use of a library and worship room. A hospital was built at the facility during World War I, motivated in part by the increase in sexually transmitted diseases. The State Farm also had a nursery to care for the children of the incarcerated women.

The State Farm was a more comfortable place than the Wethersfield State Prison, in that hygiene and privacy were taken seriously, there was less risk of physical or sexual attack, and the staff and administration were mostly female. However, sexism and racism still prevailed.

=== Niantic Correctional Institution ===
In 1930, after an addition was constructed, the facility was renamed the Niantic Correctional Institution. There were opportunities for the incarcerated women to engage with the local community. To celebrate Connecticut's tercentenary in August 1935, there was a fair, which included a dance floor, wheels of fortune, and displays of livestock and vegetables. The State Farm also sold milk, butter, and cheeses to Seaside, Mystic Oral school, and Norwich State Hospital.

In the 1960s, the state stopped farming operations in order to save money. Then, the facility began to focus more on educational programs. During the 1960s and 1970s, psychology researcher conducted studies at the prison, including Harvard psychologist Lawrence Kohlberg, who set up a laboratory in one of the women's colleges.

=== Later years ===
The Department of Correction assumed management of the Niantic Correctional Institution in 1968. In the 1980s and early 1990s, the prison faced overcrowding. In 1983, five female inmates sued the Commissioner of the Department of Correction for not providing several services. As a result of the settlement, a 20-bed mental health unit and halfway house was set up in Waterbury for female offenders and their children. Women also would have a space to meet privately with their children. In 1991, Doe v. Meachum required Connecticut's prison officials to provide AIDS education to inmates.

The facility is now named after Janet S. York, who served as the prison's superintendent from 1960 to 1968 and later became deputy commissioner of women's services for the Connecticut Department of Correction.

Novelist Wally Lamb has taught writing workshops to inmates at York and has edited and published three collections of their works: Couldn't Keep It to Myself: Testimonies from Our Imprisoned Sisters (2003), I'll Fly Away: Further Testimonies from the Women of York Prison (2007), and You Don't Know Me: The Incarcerated Women of York Prison Voice Their Truths (2019).

=== Notable Inmates ===
Shelia Davalo- Murder
