= Steven Erlanger =

American journalist

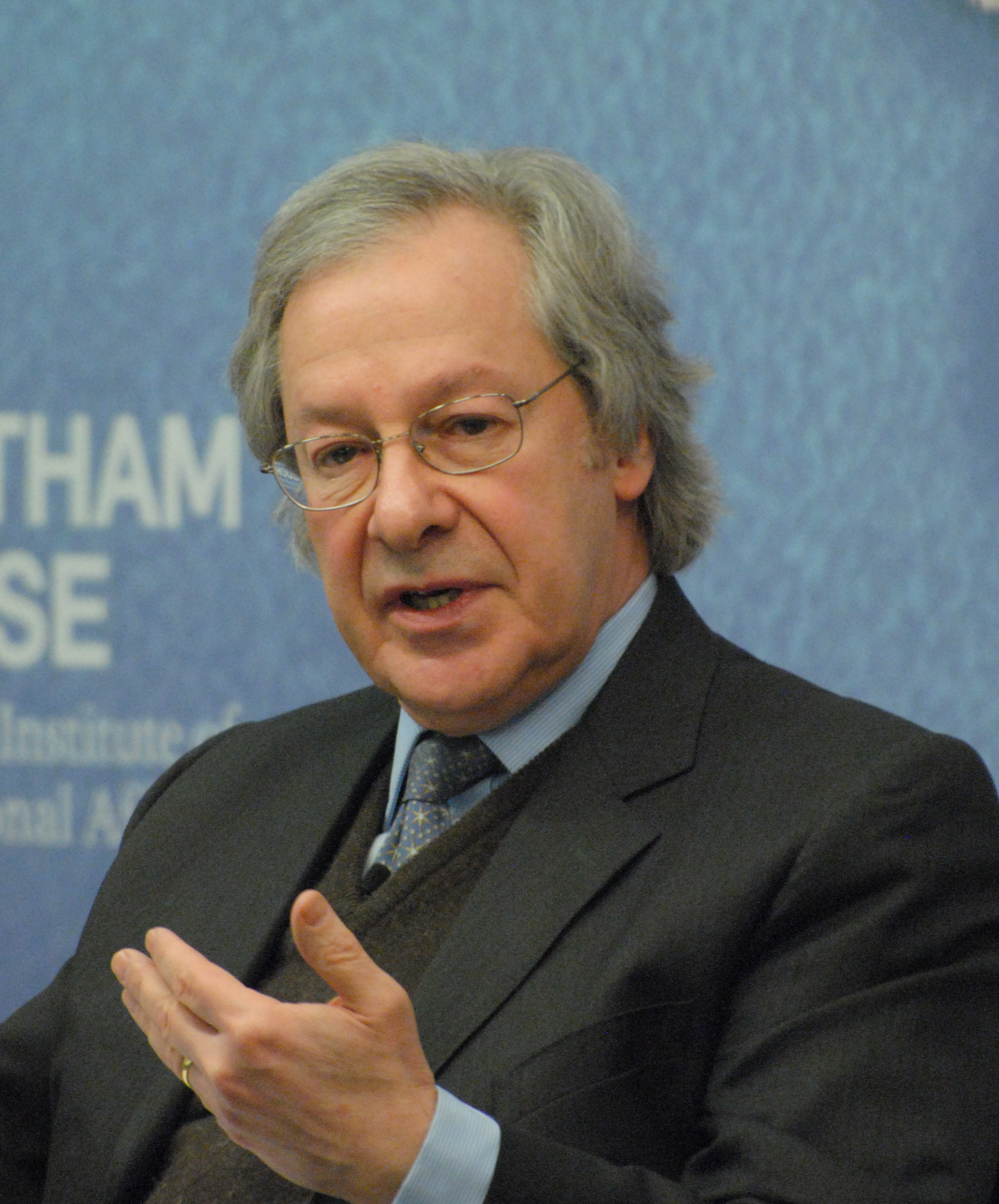
- Erlanger speaking at Chatham House in 2015
- Born: October 14, 1952 (age 73); Waterbury, Connecticut, U.S.
- Education: Harvard University (BA)
- Occupation: Journalist
- Notable credit(s): The New York Times, The Boston Globe
- Spouse: Elisabeth Erlanger

Steven J. Erlanger (born October 14, 1952, in Waterbury, Connecticut) is an American journalist who has reported from more than 120 countries. He is the chief diplomatic correspondent for Europe for The New York Times, having moved to Brussels in August 2017 after four years as the paper's bureau chief in London. Erlanger joined the Times in September 1987.

== Biography ==
Erlanger is the son of Jay and Florence Erlanger, both deceased. He is Jewish. Erlanger graduated from The Taft School in 1970.

After graduating magna cum laude, Phi Beta Kappa, from Harvard College in 1974 with an A.B. in political philosophy, Erlanger was a teaching fellow at Harvard from 1975 to 1983. Concurrent with this assignment, he was an editor and correspondent for The Boston Globe beginning in 1976, where he served on the national and foreign desks, covered the Iranian Revolution and Solidarity in Poland and was the European correspondent based in London from 1983 to 1987. He has written for numerous magazines, including The Spectator, The Economist, The New Republic, the Financial Times, New Statesman, Columbia Journalism Review, and The National Interest. France made him a Chevalier de la Légion d'Honneur for services to journalism at the end of 2013. He is also a governor of the Ditchley Foundation.

Erlanger's previous posts at The New York Times include:

- Metropolitan reporter (1987–1988)
- Southeast Asia correspondent and Bangkok bureau chief (October 1988 – May 1991)
- Moscow correspondent (March 1992 – 1994) and bureau chief (May 1994 – January 1996)
- Chief diplomatic correspondent, based in Washington (January 1996 – January 1999)
- Bureau chief for Central Europe and the Balkans, based in Prague (January 1999 – 2001)
- Berlin bureau chief (August 2001 – 2002)
- Cultural news editor (December 2002 – June 2004)
- Jerusalem bureau chief (2004–2008)
- Paris bureau chief (2008–2013)
- London bureau chief (2013–2017)
- Chief Diplomatic Correspondent for Europe (since 2017)

He is married to Elisabeth Erlanger.

== Awards ==
- 1981 – Robert Livingston Award for international reporting for a series of articles about Eastern Europe
- 2000 – German Marshall Fund's Peter Weitz Prize for excellence and originality in reporting and analyzing European and transatlantic affairs
- 2001 – ASNE's Jesse Laventhol Prize for Deadline Reporting-Individual for deadline reporting for his work in the former Yugoslavia
- 2002 – Shared Pulitzer Prize for Explanatory Reporting with other staffers of The New York Times for work on Al Qaeda
- 2013 – Chevalier of the Légion d'Honneur
- 2017 – Shared Pulitzer Prize for international reporting on Vladimir Putin's efforts to project Russia's power abroad.
- 2017 – Karl Klasen Journalists Prize for coverage of Germany and Europe and promoting trans-Atlantic understanding.

== Bibliography ==
- The Colonial Worker in Boston, 1775. Washington: U.S. Department of Labor Bureau of Labor Statistics, 1975. ASIN: B0006W3PG8
