= Northern Correctional Institution =

Prison in Connecticut, USA

- Interactive map of Northern Correctional Institution
- Location: Somers, Connecticut; 42°1′24.87″N 72°30′23.66″WNorthern CT
- Status: Closed
- Security class: Level 5 (Maximum)
- Capacity: 500
- Opened: March 1995
- Closed: June 2021
- Managed by: Connecticut Department of Correction
- Warden: 1995-1995 David May 1995-1996 Robert Kupec 1996-1999 Giovanny Gomez 1999-2003 Larry J. Myers 2003-2006 Wayne Choinski 2006-2009 Jeffrey McGill 2009-2011 Angel Quiros 2011-2014 Edward Maldonado 2014-2016 Anne Cournoyer 2016-2017 William Mulligan 2017 William Faneuff 2017-2019 Nick Rodriquez 2019-2021 Roger Bowles

Northern Correctional Institution (NCI) was a high-security state prison in Somers, in the northern part of the U.S. state of Connecticut. Until its closure, the prison housed the state's male convicts serving long sentences for violent crimes; previously, it had also housed the death row for inmates before the abolition of the death penalty in Connecticut.

It was the designated restrictive housing facility for the Connecticut Department of Correction, managing those inmates who had demonstrated a serious inability to adjust to confinement, particularly those that posed a threat to the safety and security of the community, staff, and other inmates.

The institution Group Safety Threat Member program was relocated from the Garner Correctional Institution in order to centralize restrictive housing functions. In response to this, and with a commensurate increase in the number of young offenders, the facility more than doubled the size of its educational staff in order to serve those inmates who fell under federal mandates and require special education.

The prison's inmate population reached a peak of 510 in January 2003. With the state's incarcerated population at a 32-year low, Northern was found by the state to be cost-ineffective and unnecessary, and was closed in June 2021. Remaining inmates were transferred to other prisons within the state.

== History ==
The Northern C.I. was completed in January 1995 and received its first inmates in March 1995. Also in 1995, Connecticut's death row inmates were moved to the Northern C.I. from the Osborn Correctional Institution.

In February 1997, the Chronic Disciplinary Unit arrived at Northern.

In November 1999, the Security Risk Group Threat population arrived.

In August 2000, Warden Larry J. Myers' face was slashed by inmate John Barletta, leaving him seriously injured. Barletta was serving 60 years for a 1992 drive-by shooting murder in Norwalk and life in prison without parole for the murder of his cellmate in 1999 at Garner Correctional Institution in Newtown, Connecticut.

In November 2000, the Chronic Disciplinary Unit was removed from the facility.

In September 2004, the Chronic Disciplinary Unit was returned to the facility.

As of July 1, 2014, the prison had 258 inmates (178 accused, 80 sentenced). The prison was controlled by 310 personnel from the Connecticut Department of Correction under the supervision of Warden Anne Cournoyer and Deputy Warden William Mulligan.

On June 11, 2021, the Northern C.I. was officially closed, with the remaining population transferred to other facilities over the previous several months.

== Death row and "Old Sparky" ==
Connecticut legislated lethal injection as its sole method of execution in 1995. The last person executed by lethal injection was Michael Bruce Ross on May 13, 2005. The last person executed by electrocution was Joseph "Mad Dog" Taborsky in May 1960. Connecticut's "Old Sparky" had not been tested since it was moved from Wethersfield to the Somers State Prison (now Osborn Correctional Institution) in Somers in 1962, and prison officials said the prison's electrical system could not handle it. The death penalty was abolished in Connecticut in 2012.

== Notable prisoners ==
- Steven Joseph Hayes, perpetrator of the Cheshire, Connecticut, home invasion murders
- Joshua Komisarjevsky, perpetrator of the Cheshire, Connecticut, home invasion murders

As both of these men were on death row and the death penalty has been abolished, they were considered regular inmates. Due to the severity of their crimes, it was deemed unsafe to house them in the Connecticut DOC. Both were moved to maximum security facilities in Pennsylvania.
