= Osborn Correctional Institution =

Prison in Somers, Connecticut, United States

Coordinates: 42°01′03″N 72°29′50″W

- Interactive map of Osborn Correctional Institution
- Location: 335 Bilton Road, Somers, Connecticut 06071
- Status: Operational
- Security class: Level 3 (Medium)
- Capacity: 1,900
- Opened: 1963
- Managed by: Connecticut Department of Correction

The Osborn Correctional Institution (OCI), formerly known as the Connecticut Correctional Institution – Somers, is a medium-security state prison that includes a high-security mental health unit for men of the Connecticut Department of Correction located in Somers, Connecticut. It has capacity of 1900 inmates, making it amongst the largest prisons in the state and one of the oldest operational facilities in Connecticut.

It housed the state's execution chamber until 2015, when capital punishment was declared unconstitutional. It also housed male death row inmates until 1995 when they were transferred to the nearby Northern Correctional Institution.

== History ==
OCI was opened in November 1963 as a replacement for the Wethersfield State Prison, and was originally the state's maximum-security prison until 1994 when it was changed to become a medium-security prison.

== Notable inmates ==
- Michael Bruce Ross, a convicted serial killer, was executed by lethal injection on May 13, 2005. He was the only person executed in Connecticut and all of New England after capital punishment was reinstated. Ross was voluntarily executed after waiving his appeals.
- Francis Clifford Smith, the oldest living and longest serving inmate in both Connecticut and U.S history, as well as the second longest serving inmate in world history.
