= Connecticut Department of Correction =

Association Correctional Department

- Motto: P.R.I.D.E. Professionalism, Respect, Integrity, Dignity, Excellence

Agency overview
- Formed: 1968
- Preceding agency: State Jail Administration
- Employees: Approx. 7,000

Jurisdictional structure
- Operations jurisdiction: Connecticut, USA
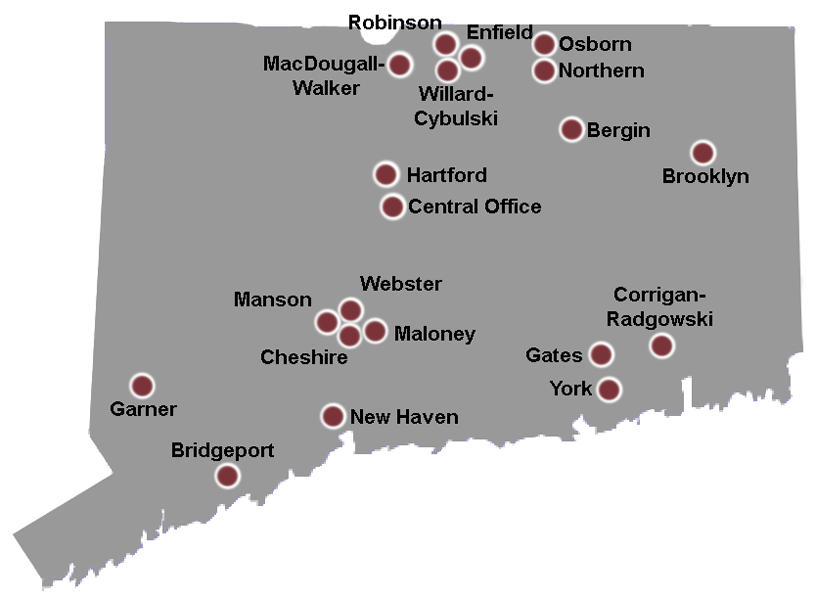
- Map of Connecticut Department of Correction's jurisdiction
- Area: 5,543 square miles (14,360 km^{2})
- Population: 3,501,252 (2008 est.)
- General nature: Civilian police

Operational structure
- Headquarters: Wethersfield, Connecticut
- Agency executive: Sharonda Carlos, Interim Commissioner

Facilities
- Facilities: 18

Website
- Connecticut DOC Website

The Connecticut Department of Correction (DOC) is the government agency responsible for corrections in the U.S. state of Connecticut. The agency operates 18 correctional facilities. It has its headquarters in Wethersfield.

== History ==
The correctional system in Connecticut began with the Old Newgate Prison in East Granby. It was an unprofitable copper mine that opened in 1705. The state began to use the tunnels as a prison during the Revolutionary War. In 1790 Old Newgate became the state prison for men and served in that capacity until 1827 when a new state prison was opened in Wethersfield.

== Fallen officers ==
Prior to the establishment of the modern Connecticut Department of Correction in 1968, 5 officers died in the line of duty, all at the former state prison in Wethersfield.

== Death row ==
Prior to the complete abolishment of capital punishment in 2015, the male death row was located at the Northern Correctional Institution. In 1995 the male death row moved from Osborn Correctional Institution to Northern. The execution chamber was located at Osborn. The York Correctional Institution houses all female pretrial and sentenced prisoners in the state, regardless of security status, so a woman classified as a death row inmate would be housed in that prison.

== See also ==
- List of Connecticut state prisons
- List of law enforcement agencies in Connecticut
- List of United States state correction agencies
- Prison
