= Frank Wojculewicz =

American convicted murderer (1917–1959)

- Born: October 10, 1917; Norwich, Connecticut, U.S.
- Died: October 26, 1959 (aged 42); Wethersfield State Prison, Connecticut, U.S.
- Cause of death: Execution by electrocution
- Status: Executed
- Conviction: First-degree murder (x2)
- Penalty: Death

Details
- Victims: 2
- Date: November 6, 1951
- Location: Connecticut
- Imprisoned at: Wethersfield State Prison

Frank Wojculewicz (October 10, 1917 – October 26, 1959) was an American convicted murderer executed in Connecticut for two murders. On November 5, 1951, Wojculewicz, who had a long criminal record for robbery and other offences, committed an armed robbery that led to the fatal shootings of a police officer and a bystander. During the same attack, Wojculewicz was shot in the back and this caused the lower part of Wojculewicz's body to become paralyzed. Wojculewicz was found guilty of murder and sentenced to death, and despite his paraplegic condition, he was executed by the electric chair on October 26, 1959.

== Early life ==
Born in Norwich, Connecticut on October 10, 1917, Frank Wojculewicz grew up in a Polish neighborhood of Connecticut's New Britain. Although details of his childhood were scarce, Wojculewicz was known to have an extensive criminal history that begun since his childhood. At the age of just ten, Wojculewicz, who was still in the fifth grade, was committed to the state reformatory in Meriden for chronic truancy. At the age of 13, Wojculewicz had dropped out of school entirely and left home to begin a life of transience and crime.

Over the next two decades, Wojculewicz developed what one newspaper later called a "travelogue rap sheet," amassing arrests in at least fifteen U.S. cities. His criminal activities spanned from Pittsburgh and, Scranton, Pennsylvania, to Cleveland, Canton, and Zanesville, Ohio, as well as East St. Louis, Illinois, and even as far south as New Orleans in Louisiana. In these locations, Wojculewicz had committed multiple crimes such as highway robbery, burglary, post office theft, larceny, assault, interstate auto theft, illegal possession of firearms and operating an unlicensed distillery.

By the age of 21, Wojculewicz had returned to Connecticut and was arrested for attempted rape in Hartford. He served four years in prison for the offense. Upon his release, he was soon arrested again for breaking and entering, though he managed to convince a judge to suspend his sentence, claiming he wanted to turn his life around. However, Wojculewicz was later jailed for assault, though briefly, before he decided to relocate to Maine, where he planned to start a new life with his wife and son.

== Murders ==
On November 5, 1951, 34-year-old Frank Wojculewicz committed a firearm robbery in New Britain, Connecticut, which resulted into the murders of a police officer and a male bystander.

On that fateful day, Wojculewicz, who travelled from Maine to Connecticut to visit his family, armed himself with a short-barrelled revolver and entered the A.Y.O. Packing Company on Washington Street at about 5:30pm. Wojculewicz forced Helen Dul and Aloysius Dzwil, the two employees present in the building, at gunpoint to open a safe, stealing cash and other valuables. As the robbery unfolded, one employee, Chester Labieniec, escaped and alerted authorities after witnessing the hold-up.

Police Sergeant William J. Grabeck (January 25, 1898 – November 5, 1951), a 53-year-old New Britain police officer, responded to the scene. Upon confronting Wojculewicz, Grabeck ordered him to drop his weapon. During a subsequent gunfight between himself and Sergeant Grabeck, Wojculewicz fatally shot Sergeant Grabeck five times. A civilian bystander, 33-year-old William Otipka (1918 – November 5, 1951), who happened to enter the building at the time, was also shot and killed in the crossfire. Wojculewicz himself was also injured and collapsed on the ground due to a bullet wound caused by Sergeant Grabeck, and while Wojculewicz tried to crawl on the ground to reach his revolver, a second police officer, Officer Theodore Wojtusik, arrived at the scene and fired several more shots at Wojculewicz to prevent him from killing or harming more people.

Wojculewicz was rushed to a hospital and received medical treatment, but the gunshot wounds on his back left him paralyzed from the waist down. While he was hospitalized, Wojculewicz was simultaneously placed under arrest and charged with two counts of first-degree murder.

Background information showed that Sergeant Grabeck was a veteran of World War I, and after the war, he joined the police force on September 6, 1919, before he became a regular on April 15, 1923, and later promoted to sergeant on March 27, 1939, taking charge of the local vice squad. Grabeck was survived by his wife and the couple had no children. The second victim, William Otipka, was an immigrant from Czechoslovakia who originally owned a factory in his native land. Shortly after his marriage in 1950, Otipka and his wife fled to Germany, and a year later, they were permitted to re-settle in the United States to start a new life, first arriving on American soil in May 1951, six months before Otipka was murdered. It was further reported that Otipka's wife struggled financially after losing her husband, and after winning $1,000 through a television quiz show, she was promised a new job and home by a New York woman who telephoned the station during the broadcast.

Sergeant Grabeck was the second police officer from New Britain to be murdered in the line of duty, and he remains the most recent one to this day. A special event was held in 1990 to commemorate the deaths of Sergeant Grabeck and the other police officer, James Skelly, who was murdered by Gerald Chapman in 1924; Chapman was found guilty of murder and hanged on April 6, 1926.

== Trial ==
On February 15, 1952, Frank Wojculewicz was formally indicted for double counts of first-degree murder, and under Connecticut state law, the offence of first-degree murder carried either the death penalty or life imprisonment.

Wojculewicz stood trial before a Hartford Superior Court jury in March 1952 for the double murder. During the trial itself, Officer Theodore Wojtusik testified against Wojculewicz, recounting how he shot the defendant after seeing him attempting to reach for his revolver while lying stomach down at the meat packing company's garage. Similarly, Helen Dul, who came to court as a trial witness, retold how she and her colleagues were held at gunpoint by the defendant, and identified Wojculewicz in court as the same person robbing her workplace.

On March 18, 1952, Wojculewicz was found guilty of first degree murder on both counts, sentenced to death in the electric chair upon the jury's unanimous recommendation for capital punishment. Judge William Shea, who formally passed sentence on Wojculewicz, set an execution date for July 22, 1952, although an appeal process would be expedited.

In the aftermath of Wojculewicz's trial, his wife divorced him and gotten custody of their elder son, while the couple's daughter, who was born the same month Wojculewicz committed the double murder, was placed under the care of another woman.

== Appeals and death warrants ==
On December 15, 1953, the Connecticut Supreme Court dismissed the appeal of Frank Wojculewicz against his death sentence.

Wojculewicz's execution date was scheduled for February 6, 1956, but it was postponed due to legal reasons. In November 1955, Wojculewicz appealed again to the Connecticut Supreme Court, which would hear his appeal on December 8, 1955. The appeal was denied in January 1956.

Wojculewicz was again scheduled to be executed for the fourth time, with the date set for March 12, 1956, but it was delayed due to a third appeal filed a week before it would occur.

Eventually, Wojculewicz's execution date was scheduled for November 18, 1957, but Governor Abraham Ribicoff granted a stay of execution for Wojculewicz in October 1957.

On January 14, 1958, the Connecticut Supreme Court rejected another appeal from Wojculewicz. After losing this appeal, Wojculewicz was rescheduled to be executed on May 19, 1958, but in April 1958, he was granted another stay of execution by Governor Ribicoff, with effect until November 17, 1958, as Wojculewicz filed an appeal to the U.S. Supreme Court.

Subsequently, a new execution date was set for November 17, 1958, and a subsequent appeal against the execution was again rejected in July 1958. However, the death warrant was staved off after another appeal was lodged to the 2nd Circuit Court of Appeals in January 1959.

On April 20, 1959, Wojculewicz's appeal was denied by the 2nd Circuit Court of Appeals. Upon the loss of this appeal, the execution date was once again set for April 27, 1959, but Wojculewicz was given another stay of execution by the governor on April 18, 1959.

Ultimately, Wojculewicz lost his final appeal to the U.S. Supreme Court, thereby exhausting all avenues of appeal against the death sentence. A new death warrant was issued in May 1959, ordering Wojculewicz to be put to death on October 26, 1959. Chief Justice Raymond E. Baldwin directed the superior court judges to expedite any final appellate proceedings pertaining to condemned inmates on the execution schedule list, including Wojculewicz, and specifically ruled that unless for special reasons necessary, the inmates should not be granted further execution stays to put an end to long delays of their death sentences.

== Execution ==
On October 26, 1959, 42-year-old Frank Wojculewicz was put to death by the electric chair at the Wethersfield State Prison. According to reports, Wojculewicz was pushed to the death chamber in his wheelchair and the guards had to lift him up and strap him to the electric chair, which was modified due to his disability. He received final prison visits from his mother, sister and brother-in-law; however, Wojculewicz's ex-wife and two children (his 15-year-old son and eight-year-old daughter) did not visit him before the execution. For his last meal, Wojculewicz ordered both salad and caraway seed roll, and also played a last game of chess with a prison guard before his death sentence was carried out.

Frank Wojculewicz was documented to be the first paraplegic criminal to be executed in the United States. For the following 34 years after his execution, Wojculewicz remained as the only wheelchair-using person to be executed in the United States, at least until the execution of Charles Stamper in Virginia on January 19, 1993. Stamper, condemned for killing three co-workers in a 1978 restaurant shooting, had become a paraplegic after being injured in a 1988 prison fight.

Wojculewicz was the second-to-last convict to be executed by electrocution in Connecticut, followed by Joseph Taborsky in 1960. Taborsky was convicted of the "Mad Dog killings" and was the last person executed by the electric chair in Connecticut. The state later switched to lethal injection, which was used to carry out serial killer Michael Bruce Ross's death sentence in 2005, 45 years after Taborsky's execution.

Wojculewicz was also the third-to-last person to be executed in Connecticut overall, as the state abolished capital punishment in 2012, seven years after Ross's execution. Prior to the state's 2005 abolition of capital punishment, Wojculewicz was also the last person to be involuntarily executed in Connecticut after exhausting all his appeals, as both Taborsky and Ross volunteered to be executed and waived their appeals.

== See also ==
- Capital punishment in Connecticut
- List of people executed in Connecticut
- List of people executed by electrocution
- List of people executed in the United States in 1959
