= List of people executed in Connecticut =

This is a list of people executed in the U.S. state of Connecticut, prior to the abolition of capital punishment in the state on April 25, 2012.

== 1639–1893 ==
Slave executions

Name	Race	Age	Sex	Date of execution	County	Crime	Victim(s)	Governor
Nepauduck	Native American		M	January 30, 1639	New Haven	Murder		Theophilus Eaton
Busheage	Native American		M	1644 (Note: Executed by beheading.)	New Haven	Attempted murder		Theophilus Eaton
George Spencer	White	41	M	April 1, 1642	New Haven	Bestiality	A sow	Theophilus Eaton
William Plaine	White	67	M	May 1646	New Haven	Pederasty	Several boys, white	Theophilus Eaton
Alse Young	White	31	M	May 26, 1647	Hartford	Witchcraft	N/A	Edward Hopkins
Thomas Newton	White		M	May 27, 1650	Fairfield	Adultery	N/A	John Haynes
Mary Johnson	White		F	June 6, 1650	Hartford	Witchcraft	N/A	Edward Hopkins
Goodwife Bassett	White		F	June 1651	Fairfield	Witchcraft	N/A	John Haynes
Elizabeth Knapp	White		F	1653	Fairfield	Witchcraft	N/A	Hopkins or Haynes
John Carrington	White		M	March 19, 1653	Hartford	Witchcraft	N/A	Edward Hopkins
Roanna Carrington	White		F	March 19, 1653	Hartford	Witchcraft	N/A	Edward Hopkins
Walter Robinson	White	15	M	March 3, 1655	New Haven	Bestiality		Theophilus Eaton
John Knight	White		M	June 1655	New Haven	Pederasty	Peter Vinson, 14, white	Theophilus Eaton
Nathaniel Greensmith	White		M	January 25, 1662	Hartford	Witchcraft	N/A	John Winthrop the Younger
Rebecca Greensmith	White		F	January 25, 1662	Hartford	Witchcraft	N/A	John Winthrop the Younger
Mary Barnes	White		F	March 1662	Hartford	Witchcraft	N/A	John Winthrop the Younger
William Potter	White		M	June 6, 1662	New Haven	Bestiality		John Winthrop the Younger
Peter Abbott	White		M	October 16, 1667	Hartford	Murder		John Winthrop the Younger
Thomas Rood	White		M	October 18, 1672	Hartford	Incest		John Winthrop the Younger
Henry Green	White		M	June 1, 1675	Hartford	Murder		John Winthrop the Younger
Cloyes	Black		M	June 1, 1675	Hartford	Murder	Female, black (wife)	John Winthrop the Younger
Benjamin Tuttle	White		M	June 13, 1677	Hartford	Murder		William Leete
John Stoddard	White		M	October 9, 1678	Hartford	Murder		William Leete
Allumchoyse	Native American		M	June 28, 1682	Hartford	Murder		William Leete
Squampam	Native American		M	March 2, 1686	Hartford	Murder		Robert Treat
Daniel Matthews	White		M	October 1694	Hartford	Rape		Robert Treat
Abigail Thompson	White		F	May 1708	Hartford	Murder	Male, white (husband)	Gurdon Saltonstall
Waisoiusksuaw	Native American		F	May 15, 1711	Hartford	Murder	Male, Native American (husband)	Gurdon Saltonstall
Young Squamp	Native American		M	May 15, 1711	Hartford	Murder	Female, Native American (wife)	Gurdon Saltonstall
Coffee	Black		M	March 15, 1720	Fairfield	Murder	Nasco, Native American	Gurdon Saltonstall
Hannah	Black		F	September 15, 1731	New Haven	Murder	Jemimiah Beecher, white	Joseph Talcott
Catherine Garrett	Native American	27	F	May 3, 1738	New London	Murder	Her infant, Native American	Joseph Talcott
Kate	Black		F	November 16, 1743	Hartford	Murder	Her infant, black	Jonathan Law
Jack	Black		M	November 16, 1743	Hartford	Rape		Jonathan Law
Elizabeth Shaw	White		F	December 18, 1745	Windham	Murder	Her infant, white	Jonathan Law
Cuff	Black		M	May 1749	New Haven	Rape	Female, white	Jonathan Law
Sarah Bramble	White		F	November 21, 1753	New London	Murder	Her illegitimate infant, newborn, white	Roger Wolcott
Isaac Frazier	White	28	M	September 7, 1768	Fairfield	Burglary		William Pitkin
John Jacobs	Native American		M	November 2, 1768	Litchfield	Murder	James Chockrer, Native American	William Pitkin
Moses Paul	Native American		M	September 2, 1772	New Haven	Murder	Moses Cook, white	Jonathan Trumbull
Moses Dunbar	White	30	M	March 19, 1777	Hartford	Treason (Note: High treason against the state of Connecticut.)	N/A	Jonathan Trumbull
Robert Thompson	White		M	June 9, 1777	Fairfield	Espionage	N/A	Jonathan Trumbull
John Dennis	White		M	August 8, 1777	New London	Murder	William Garrick, white	Jonathan Trumbull
David Griswold	White		M	May 5, 1778	New Haven	Treason	N/A	Jonathan Trumbull
William Stone	White		M	May 28, 1778	Hartford (Military)			Jonathan Trumbull
John Blair	White		M	November 10, 1778	Hartford	Counterfeiting	N/A	Jonathan Trumbull
David Farnsworth	White		M	November 10, 1778	Hartford	Espionage	N/A	Jonathan Trumbull
John Smith	White		M	February 8, 1779 (Note: Smith was executed by firing squad.)	Fairfield (Military)	Desertion	N/A	Jonathan Trumbull
Edward Jones	White		M	February 8, 1779	Fairfield (Military)	Espionage	N/A	Jonathan Trumbull
Barnett Davenport	White	20	M	May 8, 1780	Litchfield	Murder	Mallery family, white (Note: Caleb Mallery, his wife, and their three grandchildren.)	Jonathan Trumbull
Alexander McDowell	White		M	March 21, 1781	Hartford (Military)			Jonathan Trumbull
Thomas Goss	White		M	November 7, 1785	Litchfield	Murder	Female, white (wife) (Note: Also suspected in a murder 20 years earlier in East Hartford.)	Matthew Griswold
Hannah Ocuish	Native American	12	F	December 20, 1786	New London	Murder	Eunice Bolles, 6, white	Samuel Huntington
Joseph Mountain	Black	33	M	October 20, 1790	New Haven	Rape	Female, 14, white	Samuel Huntington
Richard Doane	White		M	June 10, 1797	Hartford	Murder		Oliver Wolcott
Thomas Starr	White		M	June 14, 1797	Middlesex	Murder	Samuel Cornwell, white (relative)	Oliver Wolcott
Anthony	Black		M	November 8, 1798	Fairfield	Rape		Jonathan Trumbull Jr.
Caleb Adams	White	18	M	November 29, 1803	Windham	Murder	Oliver Woodworth, 5, white	Jonathan Trumbull Jr.
Samuel Freeman	Mixed (Note: Mulatto.)	25	M	November 6, 1805	Windham	Murder	Hannah Simons, Native American (girlfriend)	Jonathan Trumbull Jr.
Henry Niles	Native American (Note: 3/4th native and 1/4th black.)		M	November 4, 1807	New London	Murder	Female, Native American (wife)	Jonathan Trumbull Jr.
Miner Babcock	White		M	June 6, 1816	New London	Murder	London, black	John Cotton Smith
Peter Lung	White		M	June 20, 1816	Middlesex	Murder	Female, white (wife)	John Cotton Smith
Amos Adams	Black	28	M	November 30, 1817	Fairfield	Rape		Oliver Wolcott Jr.
George Washington	Native American		M	June 1, 1824	Tolland	Murder	Female, Native American (wife)	Oliver Wolcott Jr.
Oliver Watkins	White		M	August 2, 1831	Windham	Murder	Roxanna Watkins, white (wife)	John Samuel Peters
William Teller	White	28	M	September 6, 1833	Hartford	Murder	Ezra Hoskins, white (prison employee) (Note: Murdered during an escape attempt from Wethersfield State Prison.)	Henry W. Edwards
Caesar Reynolds	White	30	M	September 6, 1833	Hartford	Murder	Ezra Hoskins, white (prison employee)	Henry W. Edwards
David Sherman	White		M	June 13, 1834	New London	Murder	His wife and their infant child, white	Henry W. Edwards
Lucian Hall	White	26	M	June 20, 1844	Middlesex	Murder-Burglary	Lavinia Bacon, white	Chauncey Fitch Cleveland
Andrew Potter	White		M	July 20, 1846	New Haven	Murder	Lucius P. Osborne, white	Isaac Toucey
Henry Foote	White	38	M	October 2, 1850	New Haven	Murder-Rape	Emily H. Cooper, white	Thomas H. Seymour
James McCaffrey	White	37	M	October 2, 1850	New Haven	Murder	Ann Smith, elderly, white (Note: Also murdered her husband, Charles.)	Thomas H. Seymour
Michael Jennings	White	18	M	July 11, 1854	New Haven	Murder	Esther Bradley, white	Henry Dutton
Gerald Toole	White	24	M	September 19, 1862	Hartford	Murder	Daniel Webster, white (state prison warden)	William Alfred Buckingham
Albert Starkweather	White	25	M	August 17, 1866	Hartford	Murder	His mother and his sister Ella, 46 and 14, white	Joseph Roswell Hawley
James Wilson	White	47	M	October 13, 1871	Hartford	Murder	William Willard, white (state prison warden)	Marshall Jewell
Edwin Hoyt	White	39	M	May 13, 1880	Fairfield	Murder	George Hoyt, 78, white (father)	Charles B. Andrews
Henry Hamlin	White		M	May 28, 1880	Hartford	Murder	Welles Shipman, white (night watchman) (Note: Murdered during an escape attempt from Wethersfield State Prison.)	Charles B. Andrews
James Smith	White	23	M	September 1, 1882	New London	Murder	Daniel J. Hayes, white (police officer)	Thomas M. Waller
Phillip Palladoni	White		M	October 5, 1888	Fairfield	Murder	Male, white (brother)	Phineas C. Lounsbury
John Swift	White	24	M	April 18, 1889	Hartford	Murder	Katie Swift, 25, white (wife)	Morgan Bulkeley
Jacob Scheele	White		M	June 18, 1891	Fairfield	Murder	Louis Drucker, white (constable)	Morgan Bulkeley
Andrew Borjensen	White		M	January 29, 1892	Litchfield	Murder	Emma Anderson, white (ex-fiancée)	Morgan Bulkeley
Angelo Petrillo	White		M	November 14, 1892	New Haven	Murder	Michael Demeo, white (brother-in-law)	Morgan Bulkeley

== 1894–2005 ==
In July 1894, Connecticut moved executions to Wethersfield State Prison, where an "automatic gallows" had been installed. The device hung prisoners by pulling them upwards using weights, rather than the usual downwards drop. Although claimed to be more humane than traditional hanging, this mechanism was removed in May 1936 to be replaced with electrocution that November. Only one execution occurred in Connecticut after the Gregg v. Georgia ruling of 1976, carried out by lethal injection at Osborn Correctional Institution.

Name	Race	Age	Sex	Date of execution	County	Crime	Victim(s)	Governor
John Cronin	White	38	M	December 18, 1894	Hartford	Murder	Albert J. Skinner, white	Luzon B. Morris
Kaspar Hartlein	White	40	M	December 13, 1896	Hartford	Murder	Louise Trebbe, white	Owen Vincent Coffin
Thomas Kippie	White	42	M	July 14, 1897	New Haven	Murder	Mary Kippie, white (wife)	Lorrin A. Cooke
Giuseppe Fuda	White	31	M	December 3, 1897	Fairfield	Murder	Maria Carmelia Fuda, white (Giuseppe's wife)	Lorrin A. Cooke
Nicodemo Imposino	White	24	M	December 17, 1897	Fairfield	Murder	Maria Carmelia Fuda, white (Giuseppe's wife)	Lorrin A. Cooke
Charles Bainay	White	34	M	April 14, 1898	Fairfield	Murder-Burglary	George Nichols, white	Lorrin A. Cooke
Benjamin Wallis	White	21	M	December 30, 1898	Fairfield	Murder-Burglary	Prof. David S. R. Lambert, white	Lorrin A. Cooke
Frederick Brockhaus	White	21	M	September 6, 1899	Fairfield	Murder-Burglary	Prof. David S. R. Lambert, white	George E. Lounsbury
Charles Cross	White	18	M	July 20, 1900	Fairfield	Murder-Rape	Sarah C. King, white	George E. Lounsbury
Paul Misik	White	34	M	February 11, 1904	Hartford	Murder	Charles O'Brien, white	Abiram Chamberlain
Joseph Watson	Black	18	M	November 17, 1904	Hartford	Murder	Henry Osborne, white	Abiram Chamberlain
Gershon Marx	White	73	M	May 18, 1905	New London	Murder-Robbery	Pavol Rodecki, white (Note: Suspected serial killer, also suspected of murdering Paul Parker and possibly two others along with an attempted poisoning.)	Henry Roberts
Ephraim Sherouk	White	24	M	January 9, 1906	Tolland	Murder-Burglary	Ludwika Kulas, white	Henry Roberts
Henry Bailey	White	40	M	April 16, 1907	Middlesex	Murder-Robbery	George Goodale, white	Rollin S. Woodruff
Alexander Herman	White	26	M	May 10, 1907	Fairfield	Murder	Martin Korzinsky, white	Rollin S. Woodruff
John Washelesky	White	32	M	July 1, 1908	New Haven	Murder	Peter Lucasewicz, white	Rollin S. Woodruff
Lorenzo Rossi	White	31	M	July 24, 1908	Hartford	Murder	Eli Cavanaugh, white	Rollin S. Woodruff
John Zett	White	48	M	December 21, 1908	Tolland	Murder	His wife and Violet Klotzer, 5, white (granddaughter)	Rollin S. Woodruff
Giuseppe Campagnolo	White	28	M	February 24, 1909	New Haven	Murder	George D. Sheehan, white	George L. Lilley
Raeffaele Carfaro	White	19	M	February 24, 1909	New Haven	Murder	George D. Sheehan, white	George L. Lilley
John Zawedzianczek	White	28	M	February 9, 1910	Hartford	Murder	Michael Weirdack, white	Frank B. Weeks
Andrea Tanganelli	White	26	M	March 29, 1912	New Haven	Murder	Mamie Davis, white	Simeon E. Baldwin
George Redding Jr.	White	21	M	November 1, 1912	New Haven	Murder-Robbery	Morris Greenberg, white	Simeon E. Baldwin
Louis Saxon	White	29	M	July 27, 1913	Hartford	Murder	Annie Saxon, white (wife)	Simeon E. Baldwin
James Plew	White	48	M	March 4, 1914	New Haven	Murder	William O. Wakefield, white	Simeon E. Baldwin
Matijins Rikteraitis	White	29	M	May 8, 1914	New Haven	Murder	Female, white (wife)	Simeon E. Baldwin
Joseph Buonomo	White	24	M	June 30, 1914	Fairfield	Murder	Jennie Cavaglieri, white (common-law wife)	Simeon E. Baldwin
Joseph Bergeron	White	40	M	August 11, 1914	New Haven	Murder	Elizabeth R. Dowsett, white	Simeon E. Baldwin
Bernard Montvid	White	23	M	August 6, 1915	Hartford	Murder	Rev. Joseph Zebris and Iva Gilmanaitis, 54 and 36, white	Marcus H. Holcomb
Frank Grela	White	41	M	August 13, 1915	Hartford	Murder	Female, white (wife)	Marcus H. Holcomb
Harry Roe	White	22	M	March 3, 1916	Litchfield	Murder-Robbery	Hubert B. Case, white	Marcus H. Holcomb
Isaac Williams	White	30	M	March 3, 1916	Litchfield	Murder-Robbery	Hubert B. Case, white	Marcus H. Holcomb
Pasquale Zuppa	White	28	M	March 10, 1916	New Haven	Murder-Robbery	Antonio Corsi, white	Marcus H. Holcomb
Francisco Vetere	White	25	M	October 5, 1917	New Haven	Murder	Annie Castelli, white (Joseph's wife)	Marcus H. Holcomb
Joseph Castelli	White	24	M	October 5, 1917	New Haven	Murder	Annie Castelli, white (Joseph's wife)	Marcus H. Holcomb
Stephen Buglione	White	20	M	November 16, 1917	Hartford	Murder	Raffelle Simonelli, white	Marcus H. Holcomb
Giovanni Donvanso	White	21	M	November 16, 1917	Hartford	Murder	Raffelle Simonelli, white	Marcus H. Holcomb
William Wise	White	23	M	December 14, 1917	Hartford	Murder	Anna Tobin, white	Marcus H. Holcomb
Frank Dusso	White	25	M	June 17, 1918	New Haven	Murder-Robbery	Morris Goldstein, white	Marcus H. Holcomb
Carmine Pisaniello	White	21	M	June 17, 1918	New Haven	Murder-Robbery	Morris Goldstein, white	Marcus H. Holcomb
Carmine Lanzillo	White	24	M	June 17, 1918	New Haven	Murder-Robbery	Morris Goldstein, white	Marcus H. Holcomb
Joseph Perretta	White	33	M	June 27, 1919	Hartford	Murder	Frank Palmez, white	Marcus H. Holcomb
Erasmo Perretta	White	28	M	June 27, 1919	Hartford	Murder	Frank Palmez, white	Marcus H. Holcomb
Nikifor Nechesnook	White	28	M	December 3, 1919	New Haven	Murder-Robbery	Feodor Torrant, white	Marcus H. Holcomb
Daniel Cerrone	White	31	M	March 5, 1920	New Haven	Murder	Rafele Comaoda, 14, white (stepdaughter)	Marcus H. Holcomb
Elwood B. Wade	White	24	M	May 20, 1921	Fairfield	Murder	George Nott, white (girlfriend's husband)	Everett J. Lake
John Kaurawskas	White	36	M	May 27, 1921	New Haven	Murder-Burglary	Annie Chernock, white	Everett J. Lake
Emil Schutte	White	55	M	October 24, 1922	Middlesex	Murder	Ball family, white (Note: Joseph Ball, his wife, and their son Jacob.)	Everett J. Lake
Gerald Chapman	White	35	M	April 6, 1926	Hartford	Murder	James Skelly, white (New Britain police officer)	John H. Trumbull
Soo Hoo Wing	Asian	19	M	November 8, 1927	Hartford	Murder	Ong Ging Hem, Asian	John H. Trumbull
Chin Lung	Asian	33	M	November 8, 1927	Hartford	Murder	Ong Ging Hem, Asian	John H. Trumbull
John Feltovic	White	19	M	December 10, 1929	Fairfield	Murder	Lester Jacobs, white	John H. Trumbull
Frank DiBattista	White	26	M	February 21, 1930	Hartford	Murder-Robbery	Samuel Kamaroff, white	John H. Trumbull
Henry Lorenzo	White	26	M	August 12, 1930	Hartford	Murder	Nils Anderson, white	John H. Trumbull
John Simborski	White	30	M	April 7, 1936	New Haven	Murder	Walter Koella, white (New Haven police officer)	Wilbur Lucius Cross
James J. McElroy	White	45	M	February 10, 1937	New Haven	Murder	Anna Mae Johnson, 32, white (love interest)	Wilbur Lucius Cross
Frank J. Palko	White	26	M	April 12, 1938	Fairfield	Murder-Robbery	Thomas Kearney and Winfred Walker, white (police sergeant and patrolman)	Wilbur Lucius Cross
Ira Allen Weaver	White	36	M	April 29, 1940	Middlesex	Murder-Robbery	Joseph Dripps, 51, white (Note: Weaver had also previously stabbed a Panamanian police officer.)	Raymond E. Baldwin
Vincent Cots	White	32	M	April 29, 1940	Middlesex	Murder-Robbery	Joseph Dripps, 51, white	Raymond E. Baldwin
Peter Gurski	White	28	M	February 23, 1943	Litchfield	Murder-Rape	Ellen Bourke, 66, white	Raymond E. Baldwin
Wilson H. Funderburk	Black	38	M	April 20, 1943	Hartford	Murder-Rape	Christine Paramore, 11, black	Raymond E. Baldwin
Carlo DeCaro	White	20	M	May 3, 1944	Hartford	Murder-Robbery	Salvatore Bonelli, 62, white	Raymond E. Baldwin
Nicholas J. Rossi	White	33	M	June 18, 1945	Hartford	Murder-Burglary	Hedwig Wegner, 60, white (girlfriend)	Raymond E. Baldwin
Raymond Lewie	White	19	M	October 1, 1946	Hartford	Murder	Herbert Parsell, 53, white (guard) (Note: Murdered during an escape attempt from Wethersfield State Prison. Lewie was serving time for the robbery and murder of a 77-year-old man and McCarthy for the same of a 35-year-old man.)	Raymond E. Baldwin
Arthur Tommaselli	White	25	M	October 1, 1946	Hartford	Murder	Herbert Parsell, 53, white (guard)	Raymond E. Baldwin
James J. McCarthy	White	21	M	October 1, 1946	Hartford	Murder	Herbert Parsell, 53, white (guard)	Raymond E. Baldwin
Robert Bradley	Black	38	M	April 12, 1948	New Haven	Murder	Oscar Methany and Benjamin Carter, black (Note: Serial killer, also convicted of the second-degree murder of a third black man, Henry Edwards.)	James C. Shannon
William Lorain	White	34	M	July 11, 1955	Hartford	Murder-Robbery	George Zgierski, 47, white	Abraham Ribicoff
Robert Nelson Maim	White	32	M	July 18, 1955	Hartford	Murder-Rape	Irene Fiederowicz, 11, white	Abraham Ribicoff
John B. Donahue	White	33	M	July 18, 1955	Fairfield	Murder	Ernest B. Morse, 33, white (state trooper)	Abraham Ribicoff
George James Davies	White	41	M	September 20, 1959	New Haven	Murder-Rape-Kidnap	Brenda Jane Doucette, 9, white (Note: Serial rapist, also raped and murdered 17-year-old Gaetane Bolvin and served a year in prison for molesting two young girls. Suspected in the disappearance of 9-year-old Constance Smith in 1952 around the time of his first conviction, but denied any involvement.)	Abraham Ribicoff
Frank Wojuclewicz	White	42	M	October 26, 1959	Hartford	Murder	William J. Grabeck (police sergeant) and William Otipka, 53 and 33, white	Abraham Ribicoff
Joseph L. Taborsky	White	36	M	May 17, 1960	Hartford	Murder-Robbery	Edward Kurpiewski and Daniel Janowski, both 30, white (Note: Serial killer, murdered six other people and had been previously sentenced to death but released.)	Abraham Ribicoff
Michael Bruce Ross	White	45	M	May 13, 2005	Tolland (Note: Crimes committed in Windham and New London County.)	Murder-Rape-Kidnap	Five women, white (Note: Tammy Williams (17), Debra Smith Taylor (23), Robin Dawn Stavinsky (19), April Brunais and Leslie Shelley (both 14), and Wendy Baribeault (17). Also confessed to murdering Dzung Ngoc Tu (25, Asian) and Paula Perrera (16) in New York.)	Jodi Rell

== See also ==
- Capital punishment in Connecticut
- Capital punishment in the United States
