= Prince Mortimer =

Enslaved man and veteran (1724–1834)

Prince Mortimer (c. 1724 – March 11, 1834) was an 18th century enslaved man and Revolutionary War veteran from Middletown, Connecticut. He remained enslaved after the Revolution, and remained due to a contested will after his enslaver died. He was sent to prison for life at the age of 87, accused of attempting to poison his new enslaver as a means to free himself.

== Early life ==
Born in Guinea, West Africa, Prince was brought to Connecticut around 1730. Not much is known about Prince until he was purchased, along with several others, by Philip Mortimer (1710-1794) of Middletown, Connecticut in 1745. Philip started a ropewalk in the 1750s, and trained Prince to work making rope. He became quite efficient and helped to make Mortimer's rope works prosperous.

Prince served in the Revolutionary War under several officers, including General George Washington, running errands. Although many enslaved earned their freedom through their enlistment in the war effort, Prince was not as fortunate, and he returned to Mortimer's rope works.

In 1794, Philip Mortimer drafted a new will. Philip provided Prince, and others he enslaved, their freedom upon his death. Five days later, Philip Mortimer died.

A year after Philip's death, his adopted daughter, and son-in-law, Ann and George Starr contested the will, preventing Prince's freedom.

== Family ==
According to church records, Prince Mortimer married Ann, and had 3 children, and were baptized in 1803 at Middletown's Christ Church.

== Prison ==
In 1811, Prince was accused of trying to poison his enslaver, George Starr, by putting arsenic in his chocolate. Prince was convicted of attempted murder, and sent to New-Gate Prison in East Granby, Connecticut. Prince was believed to be 87 years old.

New-Gate Prison closes in 1827, and the incarcerated men and women are relocated to the new Wethersfield State Prison. There Prince remained for the rest of his days, dying of old age, approximately 110 years old, on March 11, 1834.

== Legacy ==
Prince's incredible story has been honored in Middletown by naming a street in his honor.

== See also ==
https://www.middletownpress.com/news/article/middletown-memorialize-man-enslaved-imprisoned-17877876.php

https://www.blackpast.org/african-american-history/people-african-american-history/mortimer-prince-ca-1724-1834/

https://www.middlepassageproject.com/blog/prince-mortimer
