= Alse Young =

Wrongful execution victim

- Born: 1615; New Windsor, Berkshire, England
- Died: 26 May 1647 (aged 31–32); Windsor, Connecticut
- Other names: Achsah Young, Alice Young
- Known for: First recorded person executed for witchcraft in the thirteen American colonies
- Spouse: John Young
- Children: Alice Beamon (Young)
- Status: Executed by hanging (May 26, 1647; 379 years ago); Exonerated (February 6, 2017)
- Criminal charges: Witchcraft (posthumously overturned)
- Penalty: Death

Alse Young (1615 – 26 May 1647) of Windsor, Connecticut — sometimes Achsah Young or Alice Young — was the first recorded instance of execution for witchcraft in the thirteen American colonies. She had one child, Alice Beamon (Young), born in 1640, who was also condemned for the same crime thirty years later in the 1670s, but was not hanged.

== Background and execution ==
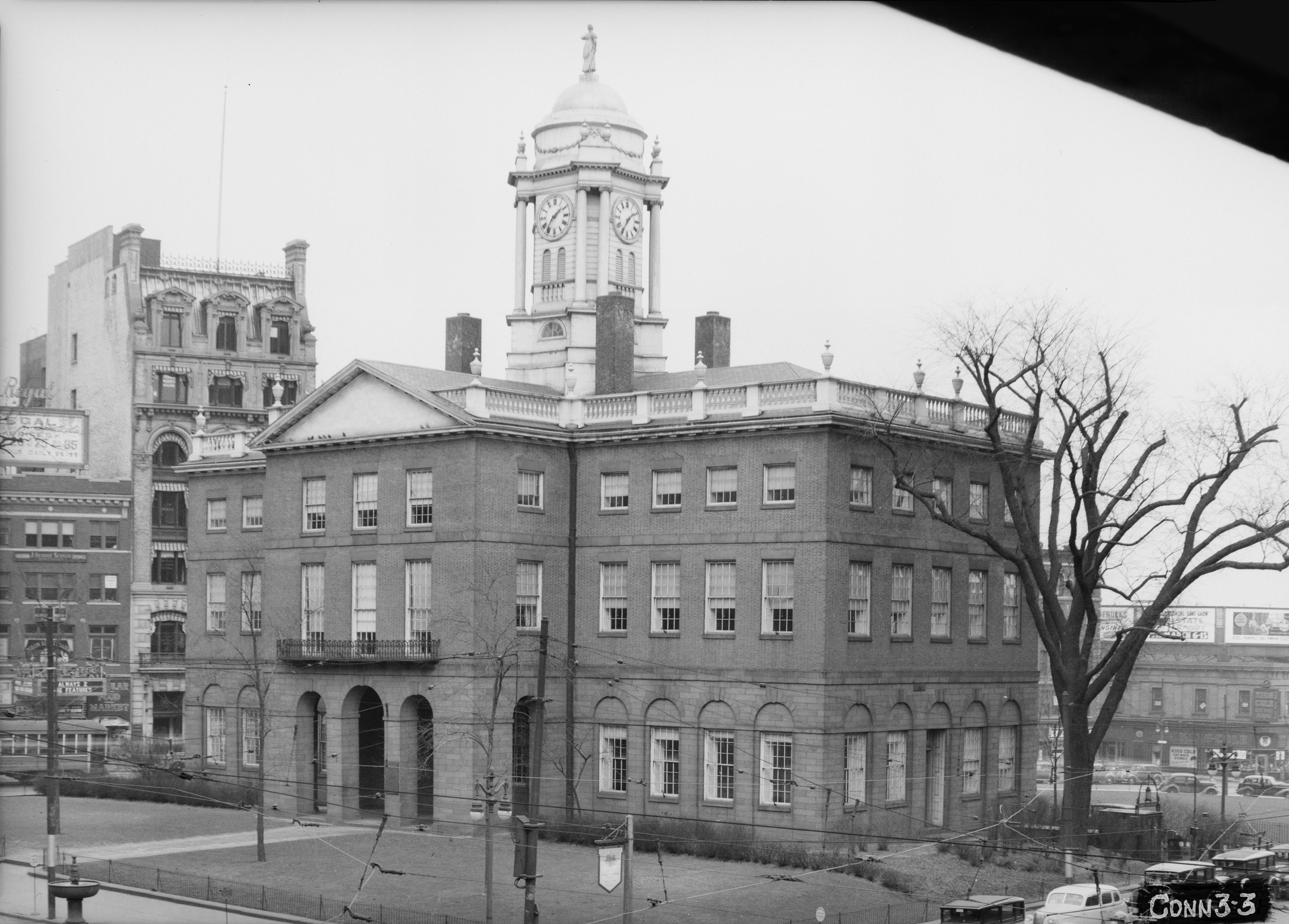
The Old State House of 1796 in Hartford, Connecticut, is on the site of Meeting House Square, where Alse Young was possibly hanged in 1647

Alse Young was born in 1615 in New Windsor, Berkshire, England, and moved to Windsor, Connecticut, during the 1630s. She is believed to have been the wife of John Young, who bought a small parcel of land in Windsor in 1641, sold it in 1649, and then disappeared from the town records. The best evidence to suggest that John Young was her husband comes from a physician. She had a daughter, Alice Young Beamon, who was accused of witchcraft in nearby Springfield, Massachusetts, some 30 years later. Her daughter Alice Young Beamon married and had children with Simon Beamon. Similarly to her mother, Alice Young Beamon was also accused of witchcraft but defended herself by claiming that she was being slandered. Even though Alice Young was a woman without a son when the witchcraft accusation was lodged, her husband was still alive during her accusation. This makes it unlikely that she was accused simply for the possibility of inheriting her husband's estate in the future. Other reasons are more probable.

There is no record of Young's trial or the specifics of the charge. The same year that Alse was hanged the death rate had steadily increased. The influenza affected everyone in that even wealthy people with more resources and access to medical care were dying at extremely high rates. Many prominent members of the noble class and legislature lost their families. Given such circumstances, a member of the elite class may have organized for someone to be hanged and scapegoated, leading to Alse's being chosen at random. She may have been hanged at the Meeting House Square in Hartford, Connecticut, now the site of the Old State House, since a jail was on the edge of the square. A journal of then Massachusetts Bay Colony Governor John Winthrop mentions "One... of Windsor arraigned and executed at Hartford for a witch." The second town clerk of Windsor, Matthew Grant, confirms her execution with the May 26, 1647, diary entry, "Alse Young was hanged." She was roughly 32 years old.

== Exoneration ==
At the urging of Beth Caruso, a local historian who wrote a book on her case, Alse Young was symbolically exonerated on February 6, 2017, by a Windsor Town Council resolution, along with Lydia Gilbert, the second Connecticut woman to be executed for witchcraft, who was also from Windsor.

== See also ==
- Connecticut Witch Trials
- Capital punishment in Connecticut
- Capital punishment in the United States
- List of people executed in Connecticut
- List of people executed for witchcraft
