= Thomas Hogg =

Thomas Hogg may refer to:

- Thomas Hogg (sodomy defendant) (fl. 1647), man accused of fathering piglets
- Thomas Jefferson Hogg (1792–1862), British biographer
- Thomas Hogg (1808–1881), English-born chief mechanical engineer for the Mad River and Lake Erie Railroad, the first railroad in Ohio
- Thomas Egenton Hogg (1828–1898), Confederate naval officer and Oregon railroad promoter
- Thomas Elisha Hogg (1842–1880), teacher, lawyer, and educator, brother of Jim Hogg and uncle of Ima Hogg
- Tommy Hogg (1908–1965), English footballer, played for Bradford Park Avenue and Rochdale

== See also ==
- Thomas Hog of Kiltearn (1628–1692), controversial 17th century Scottish minister
