= Charles Stamper =

American convicted triple murderer (1952–1993)

Charles Sylvester Stamper
- Born: November 16, 1952; Virginia, U.S.
- Died: January 19, 1993 (aged 40); Greensville Correctional Center, Virginia, U.S.
- Status: Executed by electric chair
- Conviction: Capital murder (3 counts)
- Penalty: Death (November 17, 1978)

Details
- Victims: 3
- Date: March 25, 1978
- Location: Virginia
- Imprisoned at: Mecklenburg Correctional Center

Charles Sylvester Stamper (November 16, 1952 – January 19, 1993) was an American convicted triple murderer who was found guilty of murdering three co-workers at a restaurant. On March 25, 1978, together with an accomplice, Stamper, who worked as a short-order cook at a local restaurant in Henrico County, Virginia, forced three of his co-workers into a freezer at gunpoint, and the trio – Steven Staples, Agnes Hicks, and Franklin Cooley – were all shot to death by Stamper, who also stole $4,000 from the restaurant.

Stamper was found guilty of three counts of capital murder and sentenced to death on November 17, 1978, while Stamper's accomplice was sentenced to 38 years in prison for his involvement in the murders. Stamper was later attacked in prison by a fellow inmate and left unable to walk due to injuries from the attack, and although an extensive campaign for clemency was launched on his behalf due to his physical disability, Stamper was executed in Virginia's electric chair on January 19, 1993.

== Murders ==
On March 25, 1978, in Henrico County, Virginia, 25-year-old Charles Sylvester Stamper robbed and murdered three of his co-workers at his workplace.

Stamper, who was employed as a short-order cook at a Shoney's restaurant located at 7101 Staples Mill Road, confronted his three co-workers – 20-year-old Steven Staples (manager), 43-year-old Agnes Hicks (waitress), and 40-year-old Franklin Cooley (janitor) – at gunpoint. Stamper forced the trio to go inside the restaurant's freezer before he shot all three of them dead, and together with his 24-year-old accomplice Kearnard Tyrone Bowling, Stamper stole about $4,000 from the restaurant. The bodies of the trio were not found until about 6:35am, after an estimated 35 minutes since the lethal shootings.

According to autopsy results, Staples died of gunshot wounds to the chest, and a bullet had penetrated Staples' chest from above the collarbone and traveled downward from front to rear. Hicks died as a result of two gunshot wounds, while Cooley died of gunshot wounds to the head; Hicks and Staples died at the scene, while Cooley's death did not occur until several hours after the shooting.

Both Bowling and Stamper evaded arrest for two months, until they were separately arrested on May 12, 1978. The pair were both charged with the triple murder after their capture. Through investigations, ballistic tests matched the bullets found at the scene to a .22 caliber revolver recovered from Stamper's parents' home (where Staples's car keys were also found), and forensic analysis revealed glass fragments consistent with Stamper's car. It was also uncovered that shortly after the murders, Stamper made several payments, including settling past-due rent and debts, with the money stolen from the restaurant.

In August 1978, Stamper and Bowling were both separately indicted by a Henrico County grand jury for capital murder.

== Death penalty trial ==
During the same year he committed the Shoney's restaurant murders, Charles Stamper stood trial before a Henrico County jury for triple charges of capital murder. Under the laws of the Commonwealth of Virginia, the death penalty was the maximum sentence permissible for capital murder prior to its abolition in 2021.

On November 17, 1978, Stamper was found guilty of all three counts of capital murder by the 12-member jury. On the same date Stamper was convicted, the jury returned with their verdict on sentence, unanimously sentencing Stamper to death for all three counts of capital murder. Formal sentencing was originally scheduled to be carried out in January 1979, but the hearing was postponed to another month to adduce more pre-sentencing reports to determine the appropriate sentence.

On February 9, 1979, 26-year-old Charles Sylvester Stamper was formally sentenced to death via the electric chair by Judge E. Ballard Baker. Apart from the three death sentences, Stamper was also given life imprisonment for a single robbery charge, plus three years each for all three counts of felony use of firearms. Judge Baker set the execution date for April 27, 1979, but the execution would be stayed pending a mandatory review by the Supreme Court of Virginia.

Stamper was the sixth documented convict to be sentenced to death in Virginia after the Commonwealth restored the use of capital punishment in 1976; he was the first person to be given multiple death sentences in the Commonwealth, as the five others condemned to death row before him were convicted of murders pertaining to one victim in each of their respective cases.

As for Kearnard Bowling, he was tried in December 1978 and was found guilty of first-degree murder, accessory to murder, robbery and felony use of firearms. Bowling was sentenced to 38 years' imprisonment for these above charges.

== Death row and appeals ==
After he was sentenced to death, Charles Stamper was incarcerated on death row at the Mecklenburg Correctional Center for more than a decade. By 1992, Stamper was the longest-serving death row inmate in Virginia, and the only person from the 1970s still under a death sentence in the Commonwealth.

=== Appeal process ===
In June 1979, a year after he was condemned to death row, the appeal of Charles Stamper was first lodged to the Supreme Court of Virginia, but on August 30, 1979, the Virginia Supreme Court dismissed the appeal of Charles Stamper. By 1980, the U.S. Supreme Court had denied the appeal of Stamper against his conviction.

On February 12, 1982, Stamper's federal appeal was rejected by U.S. District Judge David Dortch Warriner of the U.S. District Court for the Eastern District of Virginia.

On May 3, 1988, Stamper's petition for a writ of habeas corpus was dismissed by the Virginia Supreme Court.

On November 5, 1990, Stamper's appeal was denied by the U.S. District Court for the Eastern District of Virginia.

On August 19, 1991, Stamper's appeal was rejected by the 4th Circuit Court of Appeals.

=== Incident ===
In September 1988, his tenth year of imprisonment on death row, Stamper was involved in a fight with two other condemned inmates, Lem Davis Tuggle Jr. and Wayne Kenneth DeLong, and suffered a severe back injury that led to him becoming unable to walk. Tuggle, who was infamous for his 1984 prison escape attempt with five other death row inmates, was convicted and sentenced to death for the 1983 rape and murder of Jessie Geneva Havens, while DeLong was found guilty of the 1986 murder of Richmond police detective George R. Taylor; DeLong was additionally the first White person to be sentenced to death in Virginia for the murder of an African-American person.

According to a neurosurgeon's report cited in Stamper's 1992 clemency petition, Stamper suffered a severe spinal cord injury, resulting in partial and irreversible paralysis. Stamper was unable to stand without the aid of leg braces and a walker and had limited use of his arms and legs. For the next four years after the 1988 prison fight, Stamper was only mobile through the use of a wheelchair, except for brief daily exercise with a walker or leg brace.

In the aftermath of the fight, Tuggle was executed on December 12, 1996, while DeLong committed suicide in June 1993, a month before his execution date of July 15, 1993.

== Execution and aftermath ==
About 14 years after the Shoney's restaurant murders, in September 1992, Charles Stamper was scheduled to be executed on October 28, 1992. In response to the death warrant, Stamper's counsel petitioned for clemency from the governor of Virginia, and also appealed to the courts to stop the execution, arguing that their client should not be executed on account of his paraplegic condition.

On October 22, 1992, six days before Stamper's impending execution, Virginia Governor Douglas Wilder issued an indefinite stay of execution for Stamper. Citing a need for more information regarding Stamper's medical condition and inconclusive evidence, the governor postponed a final decision on clemency, thereby sparing Stamper from execution for a period of at least 30 days. In ten previous cases of scheduled executions before Stamper, Wilder had granted clemency only twice while he denied it in the other eight cases. Wilder's decision was not well-received by the families of the victims, as they wanted Stamper to be executed and that his disability should not be the shield precluding him from the death sentence, although advocacy groups had urged for mercy and opposed executing disabled inmates like Stamper.

On January 9, 1993, Wilder ultimately refused clemency for Stamper, and allowed the execution to move forward after he forfeited the stay order. Additionally, a new execution date was set for January 19, 1993, nine days after the date of denial of clemency. Although Stamper's lawyers appealed to the federal courts and sought to stave off the execution, U.S. District Judge James R. Spencer rejected the appeal at a federal district court, and the 4th Circuit Court of Appeals also upheld Judge Spencer's ruling. On the night of January 19, 1993, which was the execution date itself, Stamper's final appeal was denied by the U.S. Supreme Court without comment at 9:25pm.

Less than two hours after the U.S. Supreme Court denied his appeal, 40-year-old Charles Sylvester Stamper was put to death in the electric chair at the Greensville Correctional Center on January 19, 1993, and the official time of death was 11:15 pm. In his final statement, Stamper said his execution "bruised and demeaned humanity" and he hoped his death would yield "abundant fruit" for others like himself. Stamper additionally requested for permission to walk to the electric chair in leg braces and with a walker, but his request was denied for unknown reasons.

Prior to the execution of Stamper, the last execution of a paraplegic prisoner occurred in 1959, when convicted murderer Frank Wojculewicz was executed by the state of Connecticut via the electric chair. Stamper was the first wheelchair-using prisoner to be executed in the U.S. after the nation's 1976 resumption of capital punishment.

== Controversy ==
The execution of Charles Stamper sparked controversy and debate before and after it was carried out. Opponents of Charles Stamper's execution, including Virginia Coalition on Jails and Prisons and the NAACP Legal Defense and Educational Fund, argued it was a cruel and unnecessary act of retribution, given that Stamper was partially paralyzed from a prison injury and no longer posed a threat to society. Opponents said executing a disabled man served no purpose beyond vengeance and violated human dignity. They also highlighted the irony of the state rehabilitating him only to deem him healthy enough to execute. Legal and moral concerns were raised about the ethics of killing someone injured in state custody, with calls for mercy rooted in compassion and the principle of humane justice.

On the other hand, supporters of the execution maintained that Stamper’s disability was irrelevant; James Gilmore, a prosecutor who previously handled Stamper's trial, stated he was being executed for the brutal murder of three people rather than on account of his disability. Prosecutors warned that granting clemency due to disability could set a dangerous precedent. They argued that justice must be upheld regardless of health, and noted that Stamper still retained the ability to harm others. The families of Stamper's victims were unanimously vocal in their support for Stamper's death sentence, and members of the disabled community, like activist Peggy Bendrick, believed his punishment was just, emphasizing that accountability should not be avoided due to later-acquired impairments.

== See also ==
- Capital punishment in Virginia
- List of people executed in Virginia
- List of people executed by electrocution
- List of people executed in the United States in 1993

Executions carried out in Virginia
| Preceded by Timothy Dale Bunch December 10, 1992 | Charles Stamper; January 19, 1993 | Succeeded by Syvasky Poyner March 18, 1993 |
Executions carried out in the United States
| Preceded by Westley Allan Dodd – Washington January 5, 1993 | Charles Stamper – Virginia; January 19, 1993 | Succeeded by Martsay Luther Bolder – Missouri January 27, 1993 |
