= Execution of George Spencer =

Wrongful execution in 1642

George Spencer
- Born: c. 1600
- Died: April 8, 1642 (aged 41-42); Connecticut, British America
- Occupation: Servant
- Status: Executed by hanging
- Conviction: Sodomy
- Penalty: Death

George Spencer (c. 1600 – April 8, 1642) was the second person in history to be executed in Connecticut. He was executed by hanging for charges of sodomy after being convicted for an alleged sexual act with an animal, in which it was falsely claimed that Spencer had fathered a female pig's offspring despite this being impossible.

After a review of the case in 2015, Superior Court Judge Jon C. Blue, writing in a book he published, concluded that Spencer's confession was coerced and thus inadmissible, while also stating that Spencer's alleged crime of fathering a piglet was "biologically impossible". Spencer's case was described by Blue as the "first verifiable false confession in American history". Nevertheless, while it would've been impossible for Spencer to father a piglet, he confessed to bestiality with the pig immediately prior to his execution.

== Biography ==
George Spencer is described as an ugly, balding servant with a glass eye. He is believed to have lived for a time in Boston and while there was found guilty of receiving stolen goods. His punishment was a flogging. He then moved to the New Haven Colony, and continued to be a "habitual troublemaker". He was open about his lack of faith, never praying in the years of being in Connecticut and only reading the Bible when forced to by his master.

== Trial and execution ==
When a sow gave birth to a malformed, one-eyed piglet it was considered a manifestation of God's proof of Spencer's sins. Spencer was arrested, and the Puritan authorities deemed the birth a work of God. They believed that this was irrefutable evidence that an act of bestiality had taken place. He was charged with "prophane, atheistical carriage, in unfaithfulness and stubbornness to his master, a course of notorious lying, filthiness, scoffing at the ordinances, ways and people of God".

Spencer was told that "he that confesseth and forsaketh his sins shall finde mercie", but it was never made clear to him whether this mercy related to the proceedings of the court or those of God. Having witnessed a repentant child molester being whipped for his crime Spencer believed that his best option was to confess. On the realisation that this might lead to a death sentence he retracted his statement. He repeated this confession and retraction again, trying to find the best solution to his situation.

When the trial began the magistrates knew the necessity of having two witnesses to the crime. They used Spencer's retracted confessions as one witness and the stillborn piglet as the other, ruling that this was sufficient to determine his guilt. On April 8, 1642, the sow was put to death by the sword and Spencer was hanged. On the gallows, Spencer confessed to committing bestiality with the pig.

Spencer's death was early in the history of Connecticut and is reported to be only the second execution to take place in Connecticut and the first of a non-Native American.

== Claim of Wrongful Conviction ==
In 2015, Superior Court judge Jon C. Blue wrote a book reviewing old New Haven criminal cases in which he concluded that George Spencer's confession was forced and that the alleged crime of fathering a piglet was "biologically impossible". Blue called Spencer's case the "first verifiable false confession in American history".

== Similar case ==
In 1645, Thomas Hogg, another servant in New Haven, was imprisoned for several months for very similar crimes. A sow gave birth to two deformed piglets that allegedly resembled Hogg. However, Hogg never confessed to the crime, and the requirement of finding two witnesses could not be met.

== See also ==
- Capital punishment in Connecticut
- Crime in Connecticut
- List of people executed in Connecticut
