= Lydia Sherman =

American serial killer

- Born: Lydia Danbury; December 24, 1824; Burlington, New Jersey, U.S.
- Died: May 16, 1878 (aged 53); Wethersfield State Prison, Wethersfield, Connecticut, U.S.
- Other name: The Derby Poisoner
- Occupation: Housekeeper
- Spouse: Edward Struck (1841–1864) Dennis Hurlburt (–1868) Horatio Sherman (–1871)
- Children: 7
- Status: Deceased
- Conviction: Second degree murder
- Penalty: Life imprisonment

Details
- Victims: 11 (including 3 husbands and 8 children, 6 of whom were her own)
- Span of crimes: 1863–1877
- States: Connecticut, Rhode Island
- Date apprehended: June 7, 1872
- Imprisoned at: Wethersfield

Lydia Sherman (December 24, 1824 – May 16, 1878), née Danbury, also known as The Derby Poisoner, was an American serial killer. She poisoned eight children in her care (six of whom were her own) and her three husbands and was convicted of second-degree murder in 1872. Five years into her sentence, she escaped under the pretext of being sick and got a job as housekeeper to a rich widower in Providence. She was caught and imprisoned again before dying in Wethersfield State Prison on May 16, 1878, from cancer.

== Life and crimes ==
Lydia Danbury was orphaned as a child and raised by her uncle, the farmer John Claygay. At age 16, she worked as a tailor and met her first husband, Edward Struck, at age 17 through the Methodist church. They moved to New York City. After her husband became depressed after losing work, Lydia Struck poisoned him with arsenic in 1864. Six weeks later, she poisoned three of her young children in the same manner and two more children in 1865. Their death certificates listed "typhoid fever" as the cause of death.

Meanwhile, Lydia Struck worked as a nurse and married her second husband, the widower Dennis Hurlburt, in 1868. After noticing her husband's declining health, she poisoned him with arsenic. She married Horatio Sherman in 1870 and killed him in May 1871.

== See also ==
- Derby, Connecticut
- List of serial killers in the United States
