= Hannah Ocuish =

12-year old American girl executed in 1786

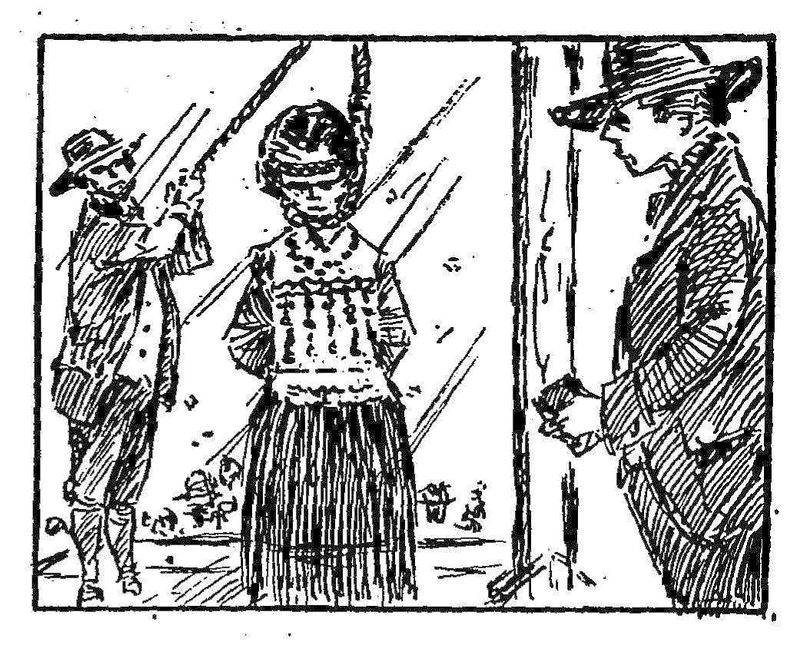
- 1964 depiction of Ocuish's execution
- Born: March 1774; Groton, Connecticut, British America
- Died: December 20, 1786 (aged 12); New London, Connecticut, United States
- Resting place: Ledyard Center Cemetery; Ledyard, Connecticut, U.S. (Plot unknown)
- Known for: Youngest person executed in American history
- Status: Executed
- Conviction: Murder
- Penalty: Death

Details
- Date: July 21, 1786
- Date apprehended: July 22, 1786

Hannah Ocuish (commonly referred to as "Occuish"; March 1774 – December 20, 1786) was a 12-year old Pequot Native American girl with an intellectual disability, who was hanged on December 20, 1786, in New London, Connecticut for the murder of 6-year-old Eunice Bolles. She is notable for being the youngest person executed in the United States. As of 2026, Ocuish's guilt, culpability, and the fairness of her trial have come into question.

== Early life ==
Henry Channing, a minister, published a sermon entitled God Admonishing His People of their Duty ... a Sermon ... Occasioned by the Execution of Hannah Ocuish, a Mixed Girl, Aged 12 Years and 9 Months, for the Murder of Eunice Bolles, Aged 6 Years and 6 Months. It describes the negative and racially prejudiced light in which her early life was presented to the court, referring to her Native American mother as an "abandoned creature", and characterizing Ocuish as a fearsome violent criminal who at the age of 6 nearly killed another victim during a robbery of a gold necklace and clothing:

As the Public may wish to be informed more particularly respecting the criminal, Hannah Ocuish, than they have yet been: we have collected the following particulars, which it may not be improper to annex as an appendix to the preceding discourse.

She was born at Groton.—Early in life she discovered the maliciousness and cruelty of her disposition: as appears from the following fact, which was represented in evidence before the grand-jury. When about six years old, she with a brother about two years older than herself, meeting a little girl at a distance from the neighbourhood, they endeavoured to get away her clothes and a gold necklace which she had on.—After beating the child until they had almost killed her, they stripped her, and disputing about the division of the clothes the child recovered, and getting away came home, covered with blood. This affair was immediately examined into, and the select-men of the town concluded to bind them both out.

Their mother, who is one of the Pequot tribe of indians, is an abandoned creature, much addicted to the vice of drunkenness.—She, it seems, not liking to have the girl bound out; brought her away and left her at a house, about three miles from the city of New-London, promising to return in a few days and take her away again. But she did not return 'till after several months, when urging the family to keep her longer they at length consented.—She continued in this family until she was apprehended for the crime, for which she was executed.

Her conduct, as appeared in evidence before the honorable Superior Court was marked with almost every thing bad. Theft and lying were her common vices. To these were added a maliciousness of disposition which made the children in the neighbourhood much afraid of her. She had a degree of artful cunning and sagacity beyond many of her years. —In short, her mind wanted to be properly instructed, and her disposition to be corrected.

== Murder trial ==
=== Murder ===
Murder of Eunice Bolles
- Location: Public road leading from New-London to Norwich
- Date: July 21, 1786; 240 years ago Around 10 AM
- Attack type: Child murder by bludgeoning and strangling
- Weapon: A rock
- Victims: Eunice Bolles, aged 6
- Motive: Allegedly retaliation for an accusation of theft
- Verdict: Guilty
- Convictions: Murder
- Sentence: Death
- Convicted: Hannah Ocuish

The victim, six-year-old Eunice Bolles, the daughter of a wealthy farmer, was found dead on July 21, 1786. Ocuish was questioned and said four boys were near the scene of the crime. When the boys could not be found, the investigators further questioned her and claimed she had confessed.

Karen Halttunen, a history professor at the University of California at Davis, summarized the crime:

On the 21st of July, 1786, at about 10 o'clock in the morning, the body of the murdered child was found in the public road leading from New-London to Norwich, lying on its face near to a wall ... The neighborhood turned out to hunt for the murderer; Hannah was questioned and claimed that she had seen four boys near the scene of the crime. When a search failed to turn them up, Hannah was interrogated again, and then taken to the Bolles home to be charged with homicide in the presence of the dead child. She burst into tears and confessed. Only at this late point in the narrative is the reader offered a sequential account of the crime. Five weeks earlier, Eunice had reported Hannah for stealing fruit during the strawberry harvest, and Hannah had plotted revenge. Catching sight of her young enemy headed for school one morning, Hannah had lured Eunice from her path with a gift of calico, then beat and choked her to death.

=== Arrest ===
One day after the murder, Ocuish was accused of killing Bolles and allegedly confessed. She was arrested for and charged with (indicted by a grand jury for) the murder and was held in pre-trial prison. The murder was reported in the July 27, 1786, issue of the Norwich Packet.

The only inculpatory evidence against her was her confession to the investigators. The confession was never corroborated by anyone besides the investigators.

Her confession reportedly included baiting Bolles with calico, beating her nearly to death with a rock, strangling her to death, and placing rocks to stage an accident. The confession specified that the motive was that Bolles had earlier accused her of the theft of strawberries. The legitimacy of this alleged motive has been placed under scrutiny in recent years, since Ocuish had faced no recorded consequence for the alleged theft.

=== Trial ===
During Ocuish's trial, she pleaded "not guilty" at the direction of defense counsel and seemed unfazed and calm while the rest of those present, including presiding judge Richard Law, were brought to tears multiple times. The court found her guilty of murder.

=== Sentencing ===
Although Ocuish's youth was considered, it could not be a mitigating factor, so the judge decided: "The sparing of you on account of your age would, as the law says, be of dangerous consequence to the public, by holding up an idea, that children might commit such atrocious crimes with impunity." He sentenced Ocuish to death by hanging. Under the state of law at that time, age and disability were not mitigating factors: a reporter wrote, "the age of a criminal was considered inconsequential; swift and relentless punishment was viewed as the only practicable method of keeping the lawless element in check." Additionally, under the Murder Act 1752, a conviction of murder required a mandatory death sentence by hanging within 48 hours.

=== Execution ===
On December 20, 1786, as she awaited her execution, Hannah's anxiety grew worse, and she spent most of the day of her hanging in tears. At her execution, she thanked the sheriff for his kindness as she stepped forward to be hanged. Spectators to the execution said that Ocuish "appeared greatly afraid, and seemed to want somebody to help her."

Ocuish is the youngest person executed in the United States whose age is verifiable. However, the United States also executed two 12-year-old boys in the 18th century. In 1787, 12-year-old Clem, a slave who was owned by Hartwell Seat, was hanged in Virginia for the murders of Henry Seat and Miles Seat. In 1791, Bill, a slave who was owned by Mrs. Ann James, was hanged in Kentucky after pleading guilty to the murder of a young white girl.

== Reexamination ==
In March 2020, leaders of the New London chapter of the NAACP assembled a group including historians, tribal members, attorneys, and the Connecticut chapter of the Innocence Project to re-examine Ocuish's case to attempt to determine Ocuish's guilt and whether or not she received a fair trial. While the NAACP-assembled group has cautioned that they may not be able to reach a conclusion, if evidence favors Ocuish's innocence or her receiving an unfair trial, it will be decided whether or not to recommend an exoneration to the Connecticut General Assembly. It has been suggested by the group and by others that her race, age, disability, and gender may have played a role in her conviction and sentence. The group will also attempt to contact remaining relatives of Ocuish and Eunice Bolles.

=== Doubt of Ocuish's guilt ===
In a 2023 opinion piece for OddFeed, writer Jessica Suess described reasonable doubt for Hannah Ocuish having committed the murder of Bolles. Suess wrote that the credibility of Ocuish's alleged confession itself is questionable, considering Ocuish reportedly did not corroborate the confession to local minister Henry Channing, who had visited Hannah several times in prison.

The article expressed further doubt about the claim that Ocuish was a violent criminal, from the fact that the widow which Ocuish was given to as a servant had not had any complaints over the six years in which she served her. The piece also criticized Ocuish's alleged motive as "weak", stating, "While Eunice may have threatened to tell on Hannah for stealing fruit, this never happened, as the girl faced no consequences for those actions ... The idea that she could have lured Eunice to a private corner with a piece of calico fabric also seems strange. Based on their previous interaction, Eunice would likely have been suspicious of Hannah and avoided being alone with her."

The article stated that Ocuish's execution may have been "itself a crime born of racism" and that "we likely will never know if she really committed the crime".

== See also ==
- Capital punishment for juveniles in the United States
- Capital punishment in Connecticut
- List of people executed in Connecticut
- George Stinney
- Alice Glaston
- John Dean
- Mary (slave)

== Sources ==
- Channing, Henry (1786). God admonishing his people of their duty, as parents and masters: a sermon, preached at New-London, December 20th, 1786, occasioned by the execution of Hannah Ocuish, a mulatto girl, aged 12 years and 9 months, for the murder of Eunice Bolles, aged 6 years and 6 months. T. Green. LCCN 03005574. OCLC 18140982.
