= Wethersfield State Prison =

Prison in Connecticut, United States

- Interactive map of Wethersfield State Prison
- Location: Wethersfield, Connecticut; 41°43′12″N 72°39′31″W
- Status: Closed
- Capacity: 788
- Opened: 21 October 1827
- Closed: November, 1963
- Managed by: Connecticut State Prison
- Director: Wardens: 1827-1837 Moses C. Pilsbury; 1837-1844 Amos Pilsbury; 1844-1850 Elisha Johnson; 1850-1851 Leonard R. Welles; 1851-1852 Elisha Johnson; 1852-1854 Leonard R. Welles; 1854-1857 William Willard; 1857-1862 N. Daniel Webster; 1862-1870 William Willard; 1870-1874 A. J. Botelle; 1874-1879 E. B. Hewes; 1879-1885 August Sargent; 1885-1893 S. Chamberlain; 1893-1899 Jabez L. Woodbridge; 1899-1911 Albert Garvin; 1911-1918 Ward A. Garner; 1918-1920 Charles C. McClaughry; 1920-1929 Henry K. W. Scott; 1929-1934 Charles S. Reed; 1934-1954 Ralph H. Walker; 1954-1956 George A. Cummings; 1956-1957 Frederick G. Reincke; 1957-1961 Mark S. Richmond; 1961-1963 Frederick G. Reincke

Wethersfield State Prison was the second state prison in the state of Connecticut. Used between 1827 and 1963, it was later demolished and the site turned into a park on the banks of the Connecticut River.

== History ==
Connecticut opened the Wethersfield State Prison in September 1827 as a replacement for the decrepit Old Newgate Prison, which had begun as a copper mine. Although the prisoners had no longer been housed in the former mine galleries by that point, the above-ground facilities were inadequate for the state's need. 127 inmates were shackled together and marched the 20 miles from East Granby to Wethersfield. The new prison was intended to be state of the art and was modeled after the Auburn State Prison in New York. Wethersfield State Prison not only followed the physical model of Auburn, but it also followed the harsh Auburn System of prisoner control until 1900. Prisoners were required to march in lockstep, forbidden from all talking, and expected to work to support the prison.

Until 1880, the cost of running the facility was met exclusively through prison labor. Both male and female inmates worked: men as blacksmiths, carpenters, coopers, and tailors and women as domestic workers and cigar-makers.

The prison was built on 44 acres at the edge of Wethersfield Cove and the grounds included the 1774 Solomon Welles House, used as the Warden's residence. Beginning as a single building, over the course of its 136-year history many more buildings and workshops were constructed until it became a "hodgepodge" of ill-matched structures within the surrounding walls.

All executions carried out by the state of Connecticut between 1893 and 1960 took place at this prison. A separate "execution house" was the site of 55 judicial hangings and 18 executions by electric chair. Warden Jabez L. Woodbridge was granted U.S. patent 541,409 for the automatic gallows used in the prison, also known as the upright jerker. The upright jerker was never very efficient at breaking the condemned's neck and was withdrawn from use by the 1930s.

In 1960, nearly 400 prisoners staged a riot that required the assistance of 100 State Police troopers and a company of National Guard riflemen to quell. Tear gas and fire hoses from local fire departments were used against the prisoners, who were complaining of harsh conditions.

In November 1963 the new State Prison in Somers was opened as a replacement for Wethersfield State Prison. All prisoners from Wethersfield were transferred to Somers and two years later the old prison was demolished. The majority of the prison property was sold to the town of Wethersfield for $1.00 and is currently the site of Cove Park, while the remainder is the site of the headquarters of the Connecticut Department of Motor Vehicles. The only visible remnant of the prison is a small marker for the former prison cemetery.

== Prison records ==
Surviving records from the Wethersfield State Prison are maintained by the Connecticut State Library. The Wethersfield prison was never a part of the Connecticut Department of Correction. Demolition of Wethersfield was completed by 1966, a year before the State Prison in Somers was transferred to the new Department of Correction.

== Notable inmates ==
- Amy Archer-Gilligan: Nursing home owner and poisoner, inspiration for the play Arsenic and Old Lace
- Gerald Chapman: The "Count of Gramercy Park," Prohibition-era gangster and murderer
- Lydia Sherman: Serial killer, the Derby Poisoner
- Frank Wojculewicz, American convicted murderer executed in 1959 despite his paraplegic condition
- Joseph "Mad Dog" Taborsky: Spree killer, the last person executed via electric chair in Connecticut
