= New Haven v. Thomas Hogg =

1647 criminal case

- Court: New Haven Colony Court
- Decided: 1647
- Verdict: Guilty of lying and stealing; Sodomy charge dropped due to lack of evidence
- Charge: Sodomy; Lying; Stealing

Case history
- Subsequent actions: Sentenced to flogging and imprisonment

New Haven v. Thomas Hogg was a criminal case which took place in New Haven Colony in 1647. Hogg was accused of bestiality when a neighbourhood sow gave birth to piglets that allegedly resembled him. Unlike several men and boys convicted of the crime and consequently hanged in the 1640s and ensuing decades, Hogg refused to confess, thus avoiding the death penalty. Called "the most interesting buggery case" ever, it left an enduring mark in the history of capital punishment.

== Background ==
Thomas Hogg was a servant from New Haven Colony, where the one-eyed George Spencer was coerced into confessing to sodomy after a sow gave birth to a deformed one-eyed piglet, which led to his wrongful execution in early April 1642. Spencer was posthumously pardoned of the conviction in 2015. Like Spencer, Hogg did not enjoy a good reputation. He was considered a liar and a thief, and his appearance offended his neighbours. Women of various social positions, including a slavewoman named Lucretia, reported his indecency, as he allowed his "filthy nakedness" (penis and scrotum) to show through his breeches. Hogg, who suffered from a painful inguinal hernia, argued that his indecency was not intentional.

== Charges ==
Five years after Spencer's execution, Hogg was implicated in what was described by University of Tennessee history professor Charles O. Jackson as "the most interesting buggery case" ever. He was already awaiting trial for theft, dishonesty and indecent exposure when he was brought up on charges of bestiality, after a sow gave birth to two piglets that allegedly resembled him. Hogg's mistress, Mrs. Lamberton, found the birth to be a sign from God, and told the authorities that one of the "monsters" had "a fair and white skin and head, as Thomas Hogg's is", and the other "a head like a child's and one eye like him, the bigger on the right side, as if God would describe the party."

Theophilus Eaton, governor of the colony, and his deputy brought Hogg to a barnyard where the crime was supposed to have taken place. They ordered him to scratch the sow under her ear, after which "there appeared a working of lust in the sow, insomuch that she poured out seeds before them." Hogg was then ordered to scratch another sow, but she was not stimulated. The governor and deputy governor were frustrated that, despite their experiment, Hogg denied the charges. Without the confession, the "impudent liar" could not be hanged because the requirement of two witnesses could not be met. Instead, he was convicted of lying and stealing, for which he was severely whipped and incarcerated. While imprisoned, Hogg was kept on a "mean diet and hard labor, that his lusts not be fed."

== Aftermath ==
The situation left a permanent mark on capital punishment jurisprudence. Hogg appears again in court records in 1648, when he was admonished for failing to appear for guard duty.
