= Syvasky Poyner =

American spree killer (1956-1993)

- Born: Syvasky Lafayette Poyner; April 7, 1956; Newport News, Virginia, U.S.
- Died: March 18, 1993 (aged 36); Greensville Correctional Center, Virginia, U.S.
- Status: Executed by electrocution
- Motive: Robbery; Witness elimination
- Convictions: Capital murder (5 counts); Robbery; Burglary; Forgery
- Penalty: Death

Details
- Victims: 5
- Span of crimes: January 23 – February 2, 1984
- Country: United States
- State: Virginia
- Weapon: Revolver
- Date apprehended: February 4, 1984

Syvasky Lafayette Poyner (April 7, 1956 – March 18, 1993) was an American rapist and spree killer who killed four women and a teenage girl during a series of armed robberies in Hampton, Virginia in 1984. Convicted of multiple counts of capital murder and condemned to death, Poyner was executed in 1993.

== Early life ==
Poyner was born on April 7, 1956, in Newport News, Virginia, living on the East End with his mother, who died in 1980. Poyner's mother was a very religious woman who often kept her son inside their 19th Street apartment. According to her friends, she would often sit outside her apartment, reading the Bible and giving religious advice. Poyner would not meet his father, William E. Johnson, until he was called to testify at his murder trial.

From the age of 14, Poyner was in and out of detention centers and jails for stealing. Johnson later said his son "could steal something in a twinkle of an eye and look at you and swear he didn't do it."

In 1974, Poyner was evaluated by a psychiatrist after an arrest for auto theft. According to court records, the doctor concluded that Poyner, then 17, suffered from "difficulty in social relations, feelings of insecurity and dissatisfaction with his own abilities." The following year, he was referred to a psychiatrist for "depression ... bizarre behavior ... suspiciousness and inability to function in the home environment."

== Adult life ==
As an adult, Poyner committed crimes dating back to 1976. He served nearly three years in prison on 1981 forgery and burglary charges and faced multiple auto theft charges. He was married to a nurse at one point but later divorced.

== Murders ==
On January 23, 1984, Poyner killed Joyce Baldwin, a 45-year-old proprietor of a beauty salon in Hampton, Virginia. She was found dead behind the counter in her shop, shot once in the left side of her head. Poyner had shot her as she pleaded for her life. A week later, in Williamsburg, Poyner killed Clara Louise Paulett, a motel manager, as well as her maid, 43-year-old Chestine Brooks, during a hold-up. On January 31, in Newport News, Poyner robbed and killed 17-year-old Vicki Ripple, an ice cream parlor clerk. Two days later, Poyner raped, robbed, and murdered Carolyn Hedrick, a candy bar saleswoman.

== Arrest, trial and execution ==
Poyner was arrested on February 4, 1984. He was caught after trying to sell candy bars he had stolen from Hedrick to a local barber. The barber, who had heard that Hedrick was a candy bar saleswoman, called the police. Poyner eventually confessed to all five murders. He said he targeted women since they were easier to rob than men, and shot them to avoid leaving witnesses. Poyner was tried and convicted of five counts of capital murder and sentenced to death. After his appeals failed, he was executed in the electric chair at Greensville Correctional Center on March 18, 1993. His last meal consisted of fried chicken, rice and gravy, and green beans. A chaplain read a statement from Poyner: "Every hurt that has ever been done . . . heal that hurt. I choose to forgive, and I ask to be forgiven." In a statement released by his attorney, Poyner also said "I am sorry for all the hurt and pain and sorrows and suffering that I caused. Please forgive me. . . . I am going home to be with Jesus."

== See also ==
- Capital punishment in Virginia
- List of people executed in Virginia
- List of people executed in the United States in 1993
- List of people executed by electrocution

Executions carried out in Virginia
Preceded by Charles Stamper January 19, 1993	Syvasky Poyner; March 18, 1993	Succeeded by Andrew J. Chabrol June 17, 1993
Executions carried out in the United States
Preceded by Robert Sawyer – Louisiana March 5, 1993	Syvasky Poyner – Virginia; March 18, 1993	Succeeded by Carlos Santana – Texas March 23, 1993
