= Michael Bruce Ross =

American serial killer (1959–2005)

- Born: July 26, 1959; Putnam, Connecticut, U.S.
- Died: May 13, 2005 (aged 45); Osborn Correctional Institution, Connecticut, U.S.
- Other names: The Roadside Strangler; The Egg Man
- Status: Executed by lethal injection
- Convictions: Connecticut; Capital felony (4 counts); New York; First degree manslaughter
- Penalty: Connecticut; Death; New York; 8 and 1/3 to 25 years imprisonment

Details
- Victims: 8+
- Span of crimes: May 12, 1981 – June 13, 1984
- Country: United States
- States: New York; Connecticut; Possibly Indiana
- Date apprehended: June 29, 1984
- Imprisoned at: Osborn Correctional Institution

Michael Bruce Ross (July 26, 1959 – May 13, 2005) was an American serial killer who committed at least eight murders and was nicknamed "The Roadside Strangler". He was executed by the state of Connecticut in 2005.

== Early life ==
Ross was born in Putnam, Connecticut, on July 26, 1959, to Patricia Hilda Laine and Dan Graeme Ross. He was the oldest of four children, having two younger sisters and a younger brother. The family lived on a chicken farm in Brooklyn, Connecticut. Ross's home life was extremely dysfunctional; his mother, who abandoned the family at least once, had been institutionalized, and beat all four of her children.

Some family and friends have suggested that he was also molested by his teenage uncle, who committed suicide when Ross was 6 years old. At age 12, Ross molested two girls. In response to his sexual behavior and curiosity, his father beat him as punishment. His mother would determine when Ross was punished, and his father would enforce the actual punishment.

Ross was highly intelligent and performed well in school. He graduated from Killingly High School in Killingly, Connecticut, in 1977, and graduated from Cornell University in Ithaca, New York, where he studied economics, in May 1981. He became an insurance salesman and also exhibited increasingly antisocial behavior. Ross began stalking women in his sophomore year of college, and, in his senior year, he committed his first rape followed by his first murder soon after.

== Criminal history ==
Between 1981 and 1984, Ross murdered eight girls and women aged between 14 and 25 in Connecticut and New York. He was sentenced to death on July 6, 1987, in Connecticut by judge G. Sarsfield Ford. In 2001, while on death row, Ross pleaded guilty to first degree manslaughter for killing Paula Perrera in New York in 1982, and was sentenced to 8 and 1/3 to 25 years in prison. He spent almost 18 years on death row before his execution in May 2005.

Ross confessed to all eight murders and was convicted for the last four. He raped seven of his murder victims and was also alleged to have raped, but not killed, a 21-year-old woman named Vivian Dobson in 1983. Plainfield police rejected the possibility that Ross had been Dobson's rapist; they did not press charges and Ross made no confession. Ross was also a suspect in several rapes and murders in Indiana; one possible victim included Candace Farris, who was vacationing in Indiana when she was taken by gunpoint and raped. She managed to escape and was later found by her friends in a nearby cornfield, distraught and without clothing. She had been seen driving off with a man that fit Ross' physical description.

=== Victims ===
1. Dzung Ngoc Tu (25) – Vietnamese Cornell University student who was abducted from Warren Hall on May 12, 1981. Her body was found in a creek at the bottom of a gorge on May 17, close to the university. Dzung's death was ruled to be a suicide. Ross confessed to her murder during a 1987 session with a psychiatrist, although he was never charged.
2. Tammy Williams (17) – Abducted from Brooklyn, Connecticut on January 5, 1982, while she was walking home from her boyfriend's house. She was later found raped and strangled.
3. Paula Perrera (16) – Abducted from Wallkill, New York while hitckhiking on April 2, 1982, after Ross picked her up on his way to Connecticut from Cornell. He raped and dumped her body near Interstate 84; she was found eighteen days later.
4. Debra Smith Taylor (23) – Abducted near Danielson, Connecticut on June 15, 1982, after her vehicle ran out of fuel. She and her husband had split up and went in opposite directions for help. Ross raped and strangled Taylor; a jogger found her skeletal remains approximately four months later.
5. Robin Dawn Stavinsky (19) – Abducted from Norwich, Connecticut while hitchhiking on November 19, 1983. Ross raped and strangled Stavinsky in a wooded area on the grounds of the Norwich State Hospital; her body was found a week later.
6. April Brunais and Leslie Shelley (both 14) – The two girls were kidnapped from Griswold, Connecticut while walking home together on April 22, 1984. Both girls were taken to Beach Pond in Rhode Island where he sexually assaulted Brunais and strangled both. Michael then put their bodies into his trunk before dumping them in a culvert near Preston, Connecticut.
7. Wendy Baribeault (17) – Abducted from Griswold, Connecticut while walking down Connecticut Route 12 on her way to a convenience store on June 13, 1984. Wendy was strangled and sexually assaulted; her body was found in a field two days later. Witness descriptions led police to Ross.

== Imprisonment ==
During his incarceration, he met his fiancée, Susan Powers, who broke up with Ross in 2003 but still visited him until his death. He became a devout Catholic after his arrest in 1984, meeting regularly with two priests through the years and praying the rosary each morning. During his time in prison, Ross translated documents into Braille, acted as a mentor to other inmates, and financially sponsored a child from the Dominican Republic.

== Execution ==
Although he opposed the death penalty, Ross strongly supported his own death sentence in the last year of his life, saying that he wanted to spare his victims' families any more pain. According to Kathy Yeager, a lay minister who visited Ross in prison for prayer, Ross believed that he had been "forgiven by God" and that he would be going to "a better place" once he was executed. She said: "He's not being punished. He's moving on to life eternal. That's what is ironic about the death penalty. He's looking forward to the peace."

Yeager also said that Ross had come to believe there was no way his death sentences would be commuted without forcing the victims' families to suffer through more legal hearings, and that he knew his life would be meaningful, even behind bars: "He's had a horrible life, and he's wanted to do good." In spite of this, an hour before the execution was to take place in the early hours of January 26, 2005, Ross's lawyer, acting on behalf of Ross's father, obtained a two-day stay of execution.

Ross was then scheduled to die by lethal injection on January 29, 2005, at 2:01 a.m. Eastern Standard Time. Earlier in the day, the execution was again postponed because of doubts that Ross was mentally competent; having fought against his death sentence for 17 years, he suddenly waived his right to appeal. His attorney claimed that Ross was incompetent to waive appeals, as he was suffering from death row syndrome. In his final days, Ross became an oblate, or associate, of the Benedictine Grange, a Roman Catholic monastic community in West Redding, Connecticut.

Ross was executed by lethal injection on May 13, 2005, at Osborn Correctional Institution in Somers, Connecticut. He was 45 years old. Ross did not request a special last meal before facing his execution, thereby dining on the regular prison meal of the day: turkey à la king with rice, mixed vegetables, white bread, fruit, and a beverage. When asked if he would like to make a last statement, he said, without opening his eyes, "No, thank you." Ross was pronounced dead at 2:25 a.m. His remains were buried at the Benedictine Grange Cemetery in Redding, Connecticut.

== After execution ==
After the execution, Dr. Stuart Grassian, a psychiatrist who had argued that Ross was not competent to waive appeal, received a letter from Ross dated May 10, 2005, which read "Check, and mate. You never had a chance!" Ross's execution was the first in Connecticut and in all of New England since that of serial killer Joseph Taborsky in 1960. It was also the first and only execution in Connecticut administered by lethal injection. As of May 2025, Ross is the last inmate executed in Connecticut. The death penalty was abolished in Connecticut on April 25, 2012, and although the state initially maintained the ability to execute inmates sentenced to death before abolition, all eventually had their sentences commuted to life imprisonment without parole in 2015. Vivian Dobson, whom Ross was alleged to have raped, became a vocal opponent of the death penalty in an effort to save Ross's life.

== Popular culture ==
Ross appeared in a British television series about serial killers in 1995. The filmmakers who produced the segment gave him the nickname "The Roadside Strangler" because the other killers in the series had nicknames. One of the producers of the series said the name may have been the result of a brainstorming session at a motel bar. Ross was not called "The Roadside Strangler" by the Connecticut media or by local law enforcement while he was alive.

In 2015, The Man in the Monster: An Intimate Portrait of a Serial Killer, a detailed account of Ross's killing spree, capture, trial, time in prison and execution, was published by Penguin Press. Written by former Columbia School of Journalism professor Martha Elliott, the book documents the ten-year telephone and prison visit relationship that developed between the author and her subject. Generally well received, the book garnered positive reviews by Library Journal, Kirkus Reviews, The Boston Globe, Booklist and The National Book Review. Elliott's experience with Ross was featured on Criminal, a Radiotopia podcast on crime, in Episode 34: Willing To Accept.

== See also ==
- List of most recent executions by jurisdiction
- List of people executed in Connecticut
- List of people executed in the United States in 2005
- List of serial killers in the United States
- Volunteer (capital punishment)

Executions carried out in Connecticut
Preceded by Joseph Taborsky May 17, 1960	Michael Bruce Ross; May 13, 2005	Succeeded by none
Executions carried out in the United States
Preceded by George James Miller – Oklahoma May 12, 2005	Michael Bruce Ross – Connecticut; May 13, 2005	Succeeded by Vernon Brown – Missouri May 18, 2005
