= Gerald Chapman =

American criminal (1887–1926)

- Born: George Chartres; August 16, 1887; Brooklyn, New York, U.S.
- Died: April 6, 1926 (aged 38); Wethersfield State Prison, Connecticut, U.S.
- Other names: G. Vincent Colwell, C. W. Eldridge, The Gentleman Bandit, George Clark, George Chartres, Maxwell Winters, Count of Gramercy Park
- Status: Executed by hanging
- Motive: To avoid arrest
- Conviction: First degree murder (April 4, 1925)
- Penalty: Death

Gerald Chapman (August 16, 1887 – April 6, 1926), known as "The Count of Gramercy Park", "The Gentleman Bandit", and "Gentleman Gerald", was an American criminal who helped lead an early Prohibition-era gang from 1919 until the mid-1920s. His nicknames came from his ability to pose as a member of the wealthy elite, which allowed him to fool potential victims and avoid scrutiny from investigators. Chapman was the first criminal to be dubbed "Public Enemy Number One" by the press.

== Crimes and escapes ==
Gerald Chapman was born George Chartres in August 1887 to parents of Irish heritage. Arrested for the first time in 1902 at age fourteen, Chapman was incarcerated for most of his early adult life. While serving time for bank robbery, he was transferred from Sing Sing to Auburn State Prison, and became acquainted with highly educated Danish-born con man George "Dutch" Anderson in 1908. With Anderson as his mentor, Chapman became a voracious reader and a self-styled gentleman, often affecting a British accent. Following both men's paroles in 1919, they began bootlegging operations in Toledo, Miami and New York City over the next two years.

In late 1921, along with former Auburn inmate Charles Loeber, Chapman and Anderson began committing armed robberies. On October 24, the three men forced a U.S. Mail truck to stop at gunpoint on Leonard Street, successfully taking $2.4 million in cash, bonds and jewelry. Their identities were unknown to the police for months, and Chapman lived the life of an aristocrat, residing with his mistress in New York's fashionable Gramercy Park neighborhood. The three men were eventually arrested by United States Postal Inspectors William Doran, Jim Doyle and William Cochraine on July 3, 1922, after Chapman attempted to sell Argentine gold notes (stolen during the Leonard Street mail robbery) to an undercover postal inspector posing as a stock broker. Chapman made headlines when he briefly got away from his interrogators at police headquarters, but he was caught before he could leave the building.

Chapman and Anderson were both sentenced to 25 years' imprisonment and ordered to serve their time at the Atlanta Federal Penitentiary. Chapman escaped from the prison on March 27, 1923, knocking out the facility's power in the process. He was wounded and captured a couple of days later in eastern Georgia, but within a week escaped the hospital, adding to his national notoriety. Anderson broke out of the Atlanta prison on December 30, 1923. The two men reunited, and were suspected by authorities in several hold-ups.

On October 12, 1924, while on a crime spree in Connecticut, Chapman murdered Officer James Skelly of the New Britain Police Department. The officer was killed in a gunfight with Chapman after interrupting a theft at a store. Though an accomplice was caught and quickly identified Chapman as the perpetrator, authorities initially refused to believe that the notorious bandit had been operating unnoticed in their area. Chapman's role was eventually confirmed through other evidence.

== Capture ==
Chapman was recaptured on January 18, 1925, in Muncie, Indiana, based on authorities being tipped off by informant Ben Hance. During his apprehension, Chapman fired at a police officer but missed.

Hance and his wife were shot to death when their car was forced off a road outside Muncie on August 11, 1925. Authorities blamed the killings on Anderson and an accomplice (who was later convicted), and the suspected motive was revenge for Chapman's incarceration. On October 31, 1925, "Dutch" Anderson and Detective Charles Dewitt Hammond killed each other in a shootout in Muskegon, Michigan.

== Trial and execution ==
Chapman was tried for the murder of Officer Skelly. During his six-day murder trial in Hartford, Connecticut, crowds gathered due to his status as one of the "top 10" criminals in America. The jury deliberated for 11 hours, after which Chapman was found guilty of first degree murder and sentenced to hang by presiding judge Newell Jennings. He proclaimed his innocence to the end, asking in his final appeal for "justice, not mercy". President Calvin Coolidge was convinced to commute the 25-year robbery sentence of Chapman to time served. He was then handed over to Connecticut authorities for execution. Chapman was executed by the upright jerker on April 6, 1926.

== See also ==
- Capital punishment in Connecticut
- List of people executed in Connecticut
- List of people executed in the United States in 1926
