= Mad Dog killings =

Killings in Connecticut between 1950–1957

Mad Dog Killings
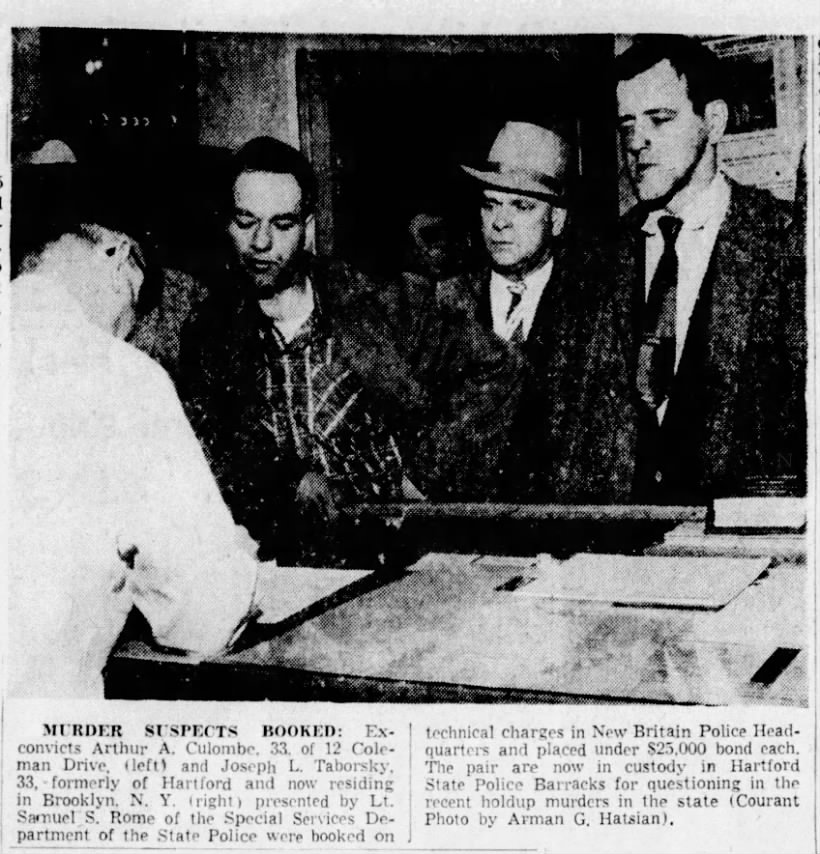
- Arthur Culombe (second from left) and Joseph L. Taborsky (far right) being booked after their arrests, Feb. 23, 1957
- Location: Connecticut (West Hartford, New Britain, New Haven, Coventry, North Haven, East Hartford)
- Date: March 23, 1950; December 15, 1956 – January 26, 1957
- Target: Businesses, particularly liquor stores
- Attack type: Robbery, murder
- Weapons: Luger pistol; Revolver; .38 caliber pistol
- Deaths: 7
- Injuries: 7+
- Perpetrators: Joseph Taborsky; Arthur Culombe (1956–1957)
- Motive: Robbery; Witness elimination
- Verdict: Guilty
- Convictions: First degree murder (2 counts)

The "Mad Dog killings" were a spree of robberies and murders committed by Joseph Louis Taborsky and his partner-in-crime, Arthur Culombe, throughout Connecticut in 1950 and between 1956 and 1957. Authorities and newspapers dubbed the killings the "Mad Dog killings" due to the brutality of the murders committed; Taborsky himself was also often given the moniker "Mad Dog." Taborsky and Culombe robbed and murdered six people during the 1956–1957 spree. Taborsky and Culombe also robbed, shot, and beat a number of other victims who survived the "Mad Dog" crime spree. The murders led to Connecticut liquor stores implementing modified hours of operation, as Taborsky and Culombe frequently targeted liquor stores.

Following the murders, Taborsky and Culombe were both apprehended. Both were charged with just two of the murders, convicted, and sentenced to death, and Taborsky became the last person executed in Connecticut's electric chair, as well as the final person subjected to execution in Connecticut before a nationwide moratorium halted all executions in the United States. Until the lethal injection execution of serial killer Michael Bruce Ross in 2005, Taborsky's was the last execution in Connecticut in 45 years. Culombe's death sentence was later commuted to life imprisonment, and he died in prison in 1970.

Taborsky's case generated particular interest and controversy due to him being one of very few people, and the only person in Connecticut's history, to be placed on death row on two separate occasions for two separate capital convictions. Prior to the "Mad Dog killings" spree, Taborsky had spent over four years on Connecticut's death row for the 1950 robbery and murder of Louis Wolfson. The main evidence against him in Wolfson's murder was from his brother Albert, who participated alongside Taborsky in Wolfson's robbery and murder and received a life sentence for his own involvement. After Albert suffered a mental breakdown in prison, Joseph Taborsky successfully appealed his conviction on the basis of his innocence, arguing that Albert's testimony was not reliable, so he was released from prison. While awaiting trial in the "Mad Dog killings," Taborsky confessed his guilt in Wolfson's murder as well.

Connecticut newspapers and historians posited that the "Mad Dog killings" played a significant role in popularizing and justifying the use of the death penalty in Connecticut, as well as in delaying any attempts to abolish capital punishment in the state, despite all other New England states trending towards abolition in the mid-20th century.

== Background ==
=== Perpetrators ===
Joseph L. Taborsky was a native of Hartford, Connecticut, born on March 23, 1924 to two impoverished Lithuanian immigrants, and grew up in Hartford's North End as an eldest sibling with one brother and two sisters. His mother Mable was a devoutly religious homemaker, and his father, a door-to-door salesman who was largely absent from the family, was mentally disabled; Taborsky's father spent significant amounts of time in a state-run mental hospital and played a negligible role in raising Taborsky.

At the age of 5, Taborsky committed his first crime when he stole jewelry from a neighbor's house and gave it to his mother. At the age of 7, Taborsky stole a tricycle and carried out several burglaries and shoplifts. His mother later stated that when he was a youth, after allegedly having his own bicycle stolen, Taborsky stole another bicycle; he received probation for that theft and a nine-month stay in a juvenile detention facility for a separate bicycle theft months later. Later, he escaped from a reformatory, and upon recapture, he was sentenced to serve an additional three to five years in custody. As a young adult, he was convicted of conducting a hold-up.

In the 1940s, as a result of an attempted escape from a different prison in Cheshire, Connecticut, he was sentenced to a period of imprisonment at the Wethersfield State Prison, during which he was tasked with cleaning Connecticut's death chamber in preparation for the triple execution of three convicted murderers in 1946. In 1948, he was sentenced to spend 18 months in prison for burglary, which he served across the country in the Washington State Penitentiary in Walla Walla, Washington.

As an adult, Taborsky was known for having a prominent chin occasionally described as a "lantern jaw", also earning him the nickname "The Chin." When Taborsky was not in prison, he worked as a laborer and a truck driver and engaged in various hobbies, including boxing.

Arthur Joseph "Meatball" Culombe was a gun collector who was born in Fall River, Massachusetts, on February 28, 1924. He was approximately the same age as Taborsky but operated at the mental level of a 9-year-old, as he had an intellectual disability that made him unable to read or tell time. Culombe had a young daughter at the time of the crime spree.

At some point while he still lived in Massachusetts, Culombe escaped from a mental hospital in which he had been confined after committing a crime. On August 21, 1944, Culombe participated in the burglary and robbery of two Hartford service stations. He vandalized the properties, stole wartime ration coupons, and stole a tire. The next day, Culombe participated in another holdup in Hartford, this time alongside two accomplices. Police found the previous day's stolen tire on the trio's getaway car. A jury convicted Culombe of his involvement in the holdups and sentenced him to serve an "indeterminate term" in the Connecticut State Reformatory, while his accomplices received prison terms.

Taborsky met Culombe in 1948 while the two worked at a cargo despatch facility in East Hartford, Connecticut. Authorities believed Culombe's disability made him impressionable to Taborsky's influence. Culombe and Taborsky began committing burglaries together until Taborsky was arrested for Wolfson's murder.

=== Murder of Louis Wolfson (1950) ===
On March 23, 1950, Taborsky's 26th birthday, Taborsky and his younger brother Albert robbed Louis Wolfson's liquor store in West Hartford, Connecticut. During the robbery, Wolfson was shot in the face and fell unconscious. His sister discovered him minutes later, and he was quickly transferred to a hospital and listed as being in critical condition. Despite his severe injuries, Wolfson regained consciousness several times over the final three days of his life and was able to provide police with a description of the shooter, whom he described as "light-haired, and baby-faced" and of average height – a description which did not match Joseph Taborsky, who stood at approximately 6 ft 4 in (1.9 m) and had dark hair and a prominent chin – before he died from his injuries.

The murder went unsolved for almost a year until Albert abruptly turned himself in to the police, confessing to the murder and naming Taborsky as his accomplice. Taborsky was arrested on January 19, 1951. Taborsky was convicted of Wolfson's murder on June 7, 1951, after his jury deliberated for nine hours. Albert, who was only convicted of second degree murder in a later trial, was sentenced to life imprisonment, while Joseph Taborsky was sentenced to death on a conviction of first degree murder.

==== Taborsky's first stint on death row (1951–1955) ====
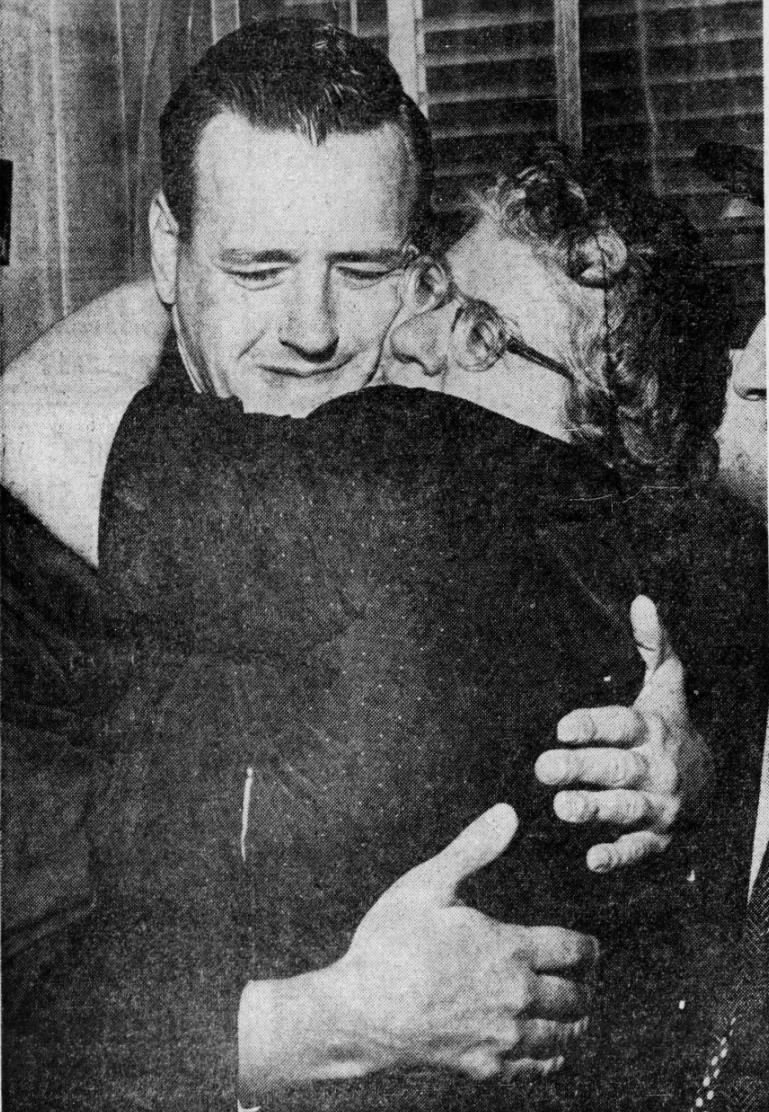
Joseph Taborsky embracing his mother after his initial release from prison on October 6, 1955

While Taborsky awaited execution in the Wolfson murder case, he steadfastly maintained his innocence. In July 1951, Albert experienced a mental breakdown, leading to his transfer into his prison's mental health unit; later, he was transferred from prison to the Norwich State Hospital. In 1955, newspapers reported that Albert had been declared "incurably insane." Following Albert's mental breakdown, some newspapers referred to Wolfson's murder as the "Cain and Abel case" based on the nature of Albert's testimony controversially landing his brother on death row. In a death row interview with Connecticut crime reporter Gerald J. Demeusy, Taborsky expressed that he supported capital punishment and the swift handling of death sentences to reduce the mental anguish that death row inmates experience from awaiting execution. Taborsky also portrayed his brother Albert as jealous, dishonest, and seeking revenge for "fraternal strife" by framing Joseph for murder.

Taborsky and his attorneys requested a new trial by arguing Albert was not a reliable witness due to his mental state. Because Albert's confession was the primary evidence investigators used to build a case against Taborsky, courts ultimately ruled in Taborsky's favor, agreeing that the evidence prosecutors used to justify Taborsky's conviction, death sentence, and continued imprisonment was insufficient. In late July 1955, after Taborsky had spent approximately 52 months on death row, he was granted a new trial. In early October 1955, prosecutors announced they would drop charges against Taborsky entirely and nullify his previous conviction due to lack of evidence, as Albert's testimony provided the main evidence against Taborsky, and courts considered Albert's testimony to be too legally dubious to use in a prospective second trial. As a result, Taborsky was released from prison on October 6, 1955.

Prior to his release from death row, Taborsky stated in an interview, "How can such great injustice be done to the innocent? If you could only realize the feeling of helplessness I had. It hurts me especially to see my mother suffer." He also stated that the first thing he would do upon release from prison would be to stay in a monastery in New York to recover from his stay on death row, which he called an "inhuman ordeal." After his release, when a crowd of reporters who met him outside the prison asked him for further comment, he committed himself to living a law-abiding life: "You can't beat the law. From now on, I'm not even going to get a parking ticket."

== "Mad Dog" killings (1956–1957) ==
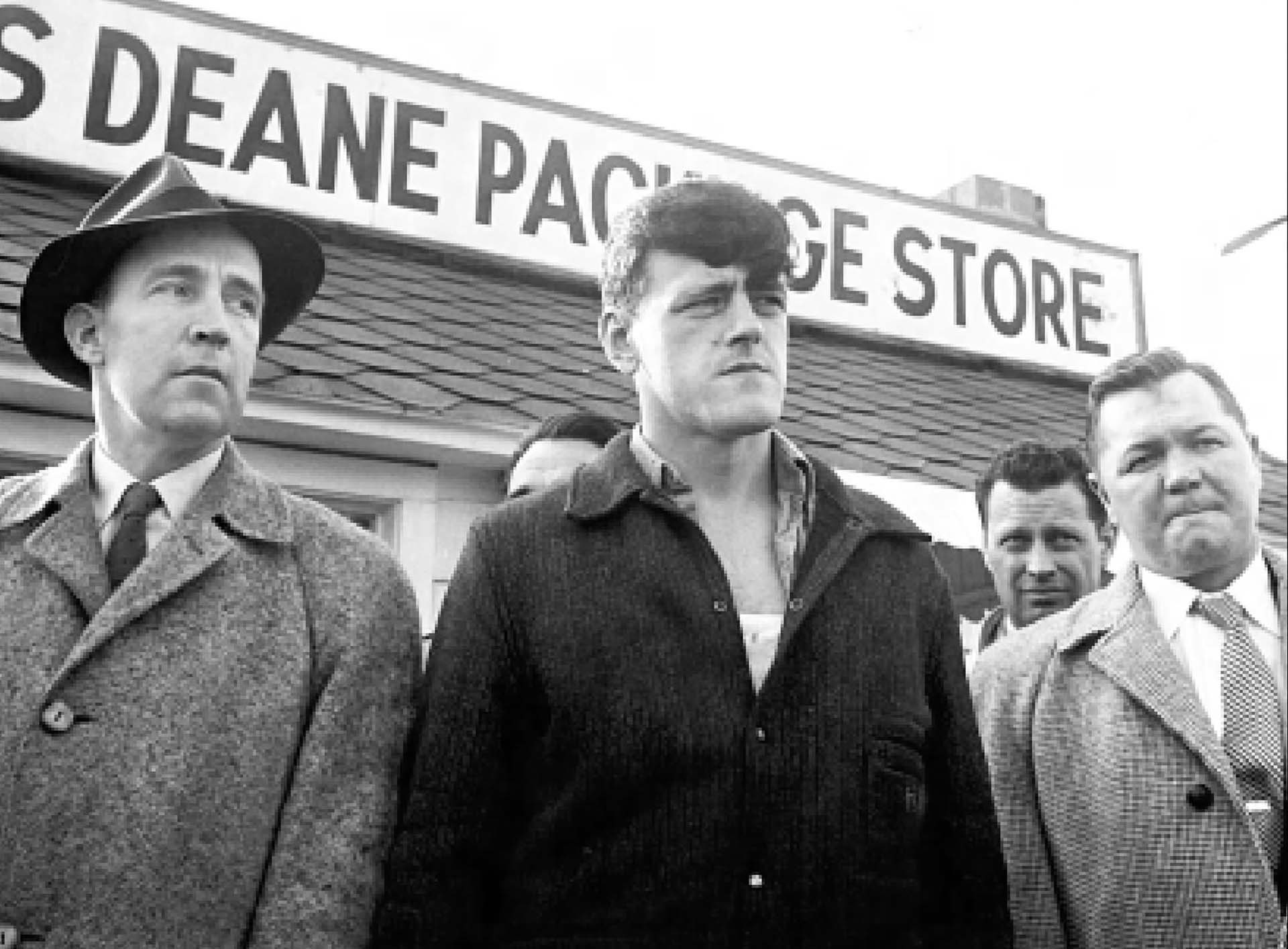
Joseph "Mad Dog" Taborsky (center) on March 2, 1957, standing between investigators as he answers questions about the robbery of Silas Deane Package Store in Rocky Hill

Less than one year after his release from prison, Taborsky moved from Hartford to Brooklyn, New York, although he visited Hartford frequently to see his mother, who still lived there. Taborsky also married a woman who met him by sending him letters while he was on death row. Unhappy with his marriage and unable to find steady work, he soon resumed committing armed robberies in September 1956 and reunited with Culombe in Connecticut with the intent of committing additional crimes together in December 1956.

Before escalating to murder, Taborsky and Culombe started with a string of burglaries and robberies of businesses in Hartford and Rocky Hill, Connecticut. In the robbery of a hotel in December 1956, the hotel's clerk escaped from the two without incurring injuries, but during one liquor store robbery in Hartford on December 4, 1956, the owner, Jack Rosen, was pistol-whipped severely to the point of requiring several stitches after the attack. In the robbery of Silas Deane Package Store in Rocky Hill on December 11, 1956, the two pistol-whipped Peter Barone, the store's owner, in the head and robbed his store of at least $100 USD.

=== Attempted murder of Nickola Leone (December 15, 1956) ===
On December 15, 1956, approximately one hour prior to the murders of Edward Kurpiewski and Daniel Janowski, Taborsky and Culombe shot 67-year-old tailor Nickola Leone in the face in Leone's shop. The bullet lodged in Leone's neck. However, Leone survived the attack and later provided police with a description of his assailants, telling authorities the man who shot him wore a "red, polka dotted handkerchief over his face." Leone spent one week in the hospital, and after his release, police stationed units by his home to deter his assailants from returning to harm him further. Leone closed his store because he needed time to recover; his store was still closed at the time Taborsky and Culombe were captured in late February 1957.

=== Edward Kurpiewski and Daniel Janowski (December 15, 1956) ===
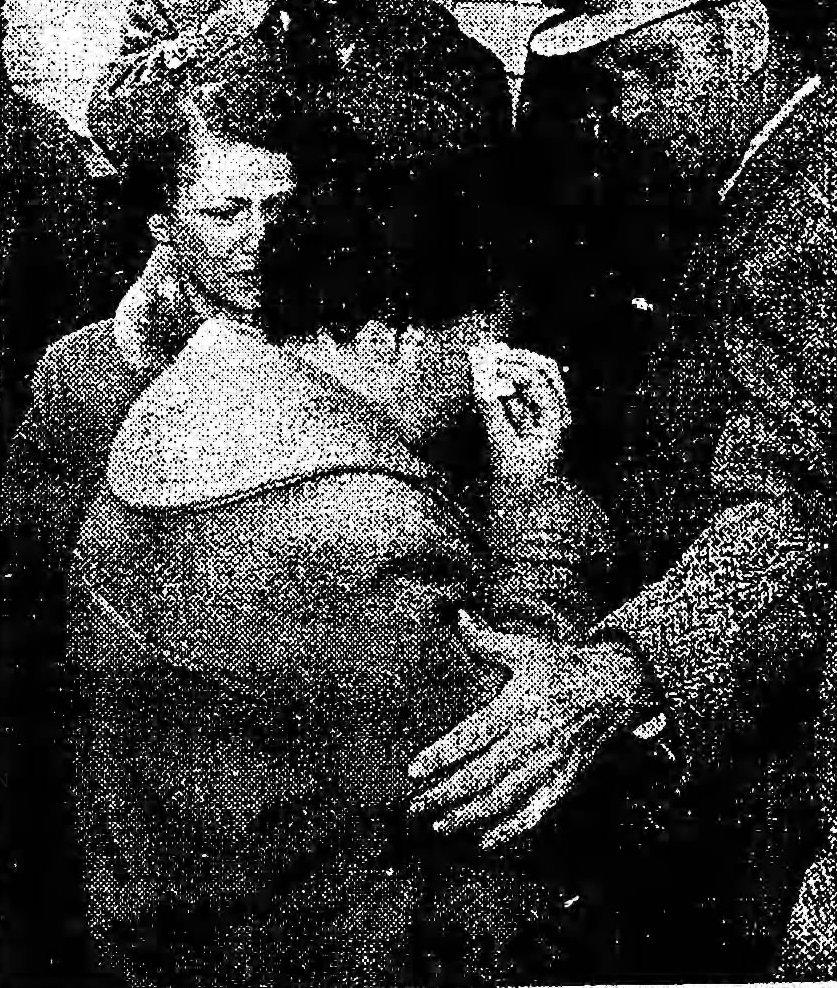
Lieutenant Sam Rome comforting Daniel Janowski's widow

One hour after Leone's attempted murder, at approximately 6:00 p.m., Culombe and Taborsky drove in Culombe's Oldsmobile to Kurp's, a gas and service station in New Britain, Connecticut, with the intent to rob the establishment. The owner of the station, 30-year-old Edward J. Kurpiewski, serviced the car while Taborsky left the car to purportedly use the restroom and Culombe paid for the gasoline. After paying, Culombe held Kurpiewski at gunpoint and ordered him to enter the gas station's boiler room. Culombe then shot Kurpiewski with a .32 caliber "Russian-style revolver" and robbed him of his wallet while Taborsky searched for money in the gas station's main office. Culombe joined him soon after. As they took money from the cash register, Daniel J. Janowski, a 30-year-old prospective customer, drove up to the gas station with his infant daughter and stopped by the gasoline pumps. Taborsky and Culombe waited inside the building for Janowski to drive away, but he did not. Taborsky and Culombe then exited the station and approached Janowski's car, with Culombe pretending to service the car for some time before Taborsky held Janowski at gunpoint and robbed him of his wallet. The two then ordered Janowski to enter the station's bathroom, where Taborsky shot him twice in the head. Afterwards, the two drove to Culombe's house, divided the money amongst each other, and disposed of the revolver in a shallow pond, after which Taborsky returned to his home in Brooklyn, New York. Both Kurpiewski and Janowski died as a result of their wounds. Both murder victims were honored with a military burial, as both served in the United States Armed Forces.

An hour after the murders, a bus driver discovered Janowski's daughter in her father's abandoned car; Taborsky and Culombe decided to leave her unharmed because they determined she was too young to implicate them. Police later found that the robbers left $133 in the cash register.

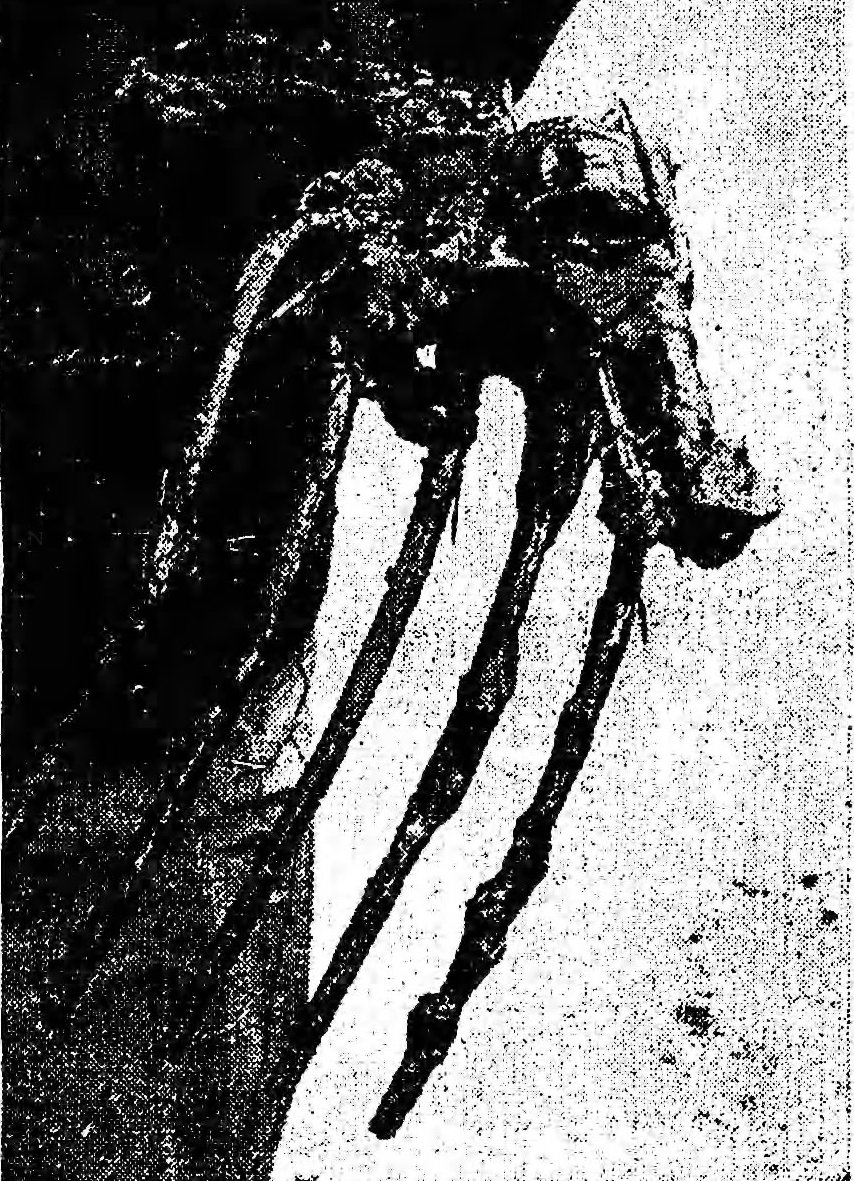
Investigators recovering the revolver used in the murders of Kurpiewski and Janowski

Days after the murders of Kurpiewski and Janowski, Governor Abraham Ribicoff offered a $3,000 award for information leading to the arrest and conviction of the perpetrators, in conjunction with a $2,000 reward posted earlier by New Britain's mayor Joseph Morelli and a $25 reward from a local dry cleaning and laundry service. The Connecticut State Police also entered the investigation around December 19. At the time, police believed Nickola Leone's shooting to have been connected to the murders of Kurpiewski and Janowski and later tested the bullet from Leone's shooting against the bullets used in the subsequent two murders that day. Also following the double murders of Kurpiewski and Janowski, Connecticut State Police organized a special force of investigators tasked specifically with working on the "Mad Dog" murders. Initially, they hired 12 officers to work on the case, but just before January 1957, they hired nine additional police officers to aid with the investigation. The leader of the special force was Lieutenant Sam Rome. After the murders of Bernard and Ruth Speyer, Connecticut State Police established a special headquarters in North Haven tasked specifically with investigating the killings. Liquor store operators started arming themselves and bringing dogs to work as protection against the killers.

=== Attempted murder of the Vintons (December 21, 1956) ===
On December 21, 1956, Taborsky and Culombe entered a grocery store in Coventry, Connecticut, belonging to Arthur Vinton, 64, and his 62-year-old wife, while the couple's three-year-old granddaughter Lorry was with them. Taborsky and Culombe pistol-whipped Vinton and his wife, but they did not shoot them. Taborsky ordered Culombe to kill Lorry. Reluctant to kill her, Culombe allegedly took Lorry to a different part of the store and told her to be quiet. He then allegedly shot his gun into the floor so Taborsky would think Lorry was dead. Taborsky and Culombe stole $100 from the Vintons' store. By January 7, 1957, Mr. and Mrs. Vinton, who survived the attack, provided police with a description of the suspects, stating both stood over 6 ft (1.8 m) and had dark-colored hair.

=== Samuel Cohn (December 26, 1956) ===
On December 26, 1956, between 8:15 and 8:30 p.m., Taborsky and Culombe entered a liquor store in East Hartford, Connecticut, and shot the owner, 65-year-old Samuel Cohn, twice in the head, killing him. The two emptied the cash register and left the drawer open. They also rifled through Cohn's pockets and stole the money he had on him. A customer discovered Cohn's body lying behind a counter. Although there were no witnesses and people who lived next door to Cohn's store did not hear or see anything amiss, police immediately connected Cohn's murder to the murders of Kurpiewski and Janowski on December 15 due to the similar way the killers rifled through the victims' cash registers and pockets, shot the victims in the head, and fled the scene without leaving additional evidence.

After Cohn's murder, East Hartford Mayor John Torpey posted a $1,000 reward for information leading to the capture of Cohn's killers.

=== Bernard and Ruth Speyer (January 5, 1957) ===
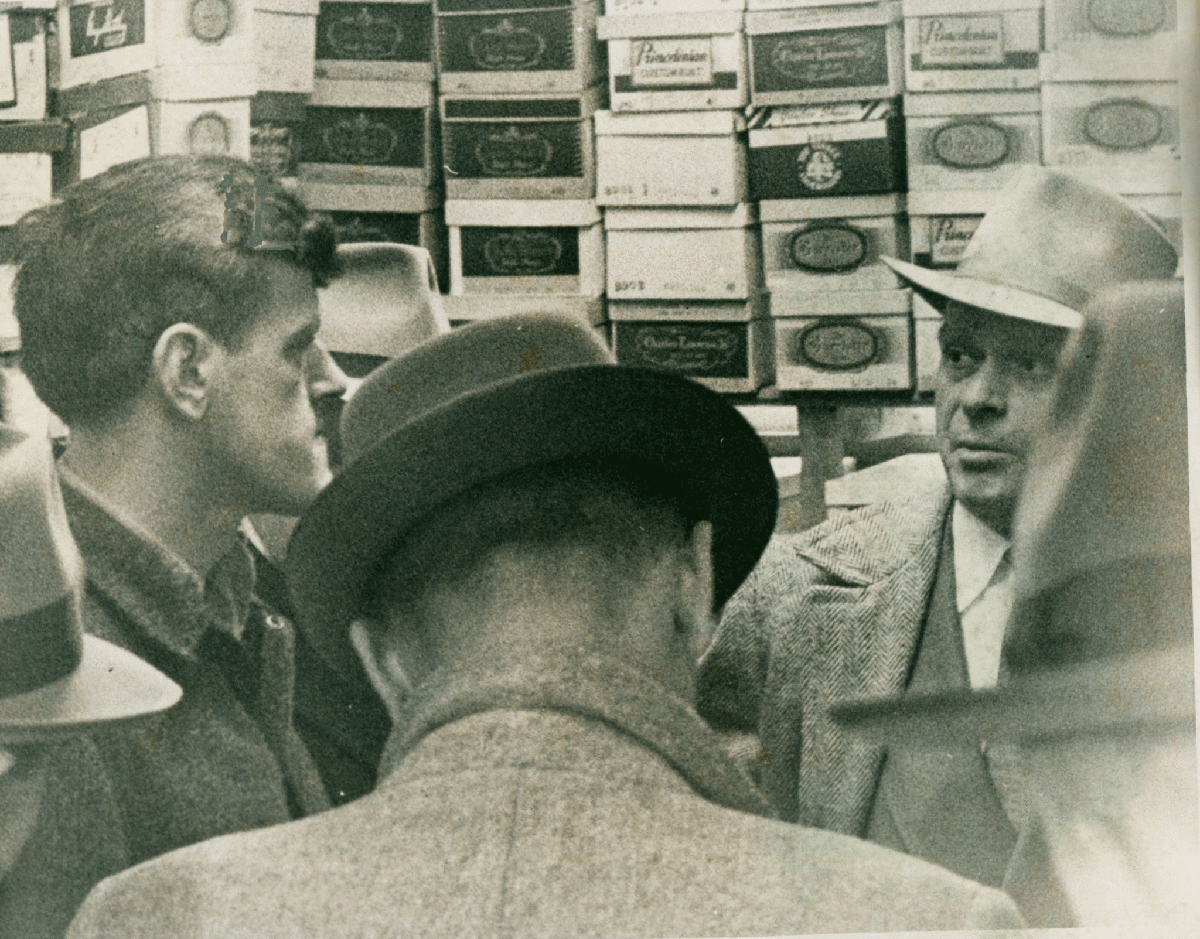
Joseph Taborsky (left) with investigators in Frank Adinolfi's shoe store

On January 5, 1957, Taborsky and Culombe robbed a shoe store in North Haven, Connecticut. They forced the store's owner, 44-year-old Frank Adinolfi, into a back room, and Culombe pistol-whipped him. Believing him to be dead, they then stole $62 combined from the cash register and Adinolfi's wallet. They also robbed 48-year-old Bernard Speyer and his 45-year-old wife Ruth, who were customers in the store and witnesses to Adinolfi's beating, of an unknown amount of money before forcing both to kneel on the floor and fatally shooting them both in the back of the head with a .38 caliber pistol.

Although Adinolfi was severely injured and left for dead, Adinolfi survived the attack and told police that upon entering the store, Taborsky had requested to see size 12 shoes. Upon a lengthy review of prison records, authorities noted Taborsky wore the same size. Police showed Adinolfi a photograph of Taborsky and Culombe, and Adinolfi made a positive identification of Culombe as the man who had pistol-whipped him.

=== John M. Rosenthal (January 26, 1957) ===
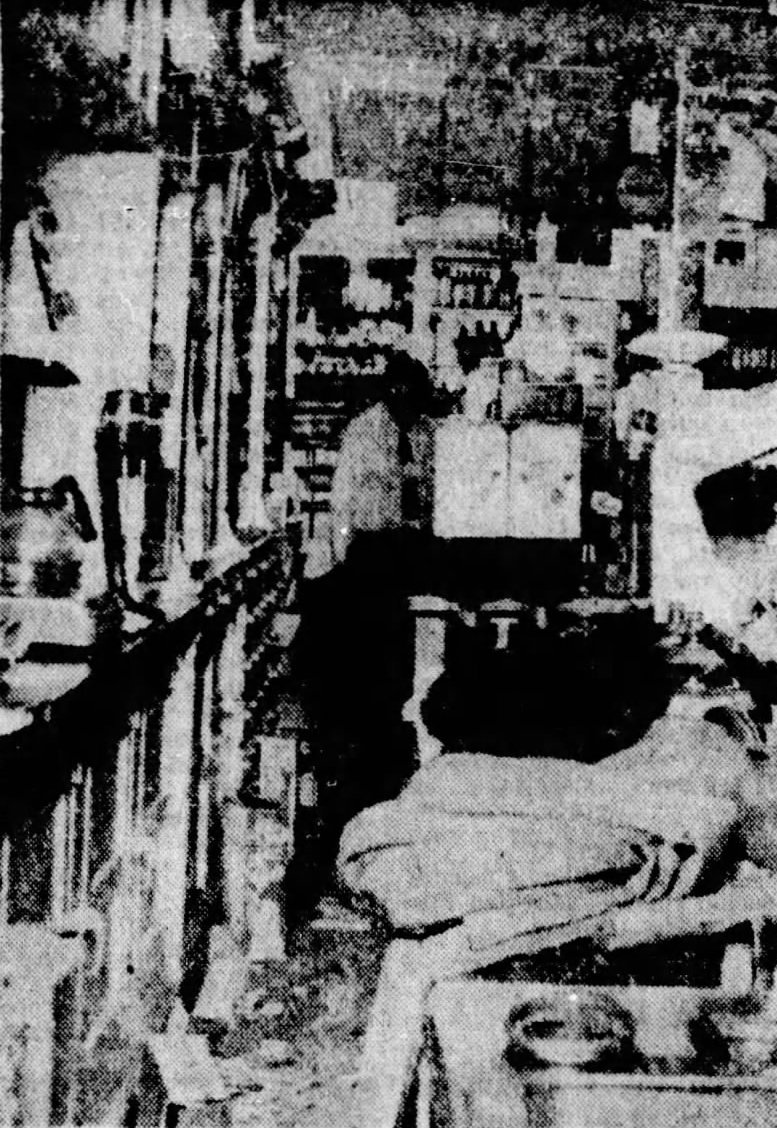
John Rosenthal's drug store, pictured 2 days after his murder, while detectives investigate the crime

On January 26, 1957, at approximately 9:00 p.m., Taborsky and Culombe robbed Rosenthal's Drug Store, owned by 69-year-old John M. Rosenthal, in Hartford, while the victim's son Henry was working in the drug store's basement. Rosenthal was alone on the ground level of the store at the time of the murder. Taborsky shot Rosenthal twice in the chest with a 9 mm caliber automatic Luger pistol and left him to die. After Henry heard the gunshots, he emerged from the basement and witnessed Taborsky standing by the cash register. Henry threw a medicine bottle at Taborsky, and Taborsky responded by shooting at Henry; Taborsky missed and shot into a wall instead. Taborsky then ran out the door and fled to a getaway car, which Henry observed to have been a dark-colored Studebaker, with "a companion" driving away. Henry Rosenthal provided investigators with a description of the shooter, stating the man was tall and 30 to 40 years old, had dark hair, and wore an overcoat.

== Capture and confessions ==
Based on the evidence Adinolfi provided investigators, police arrested Taborsky and Culombe "on a hunch" on February 23, 1957, and charged the two with breach of the peace pending the results of a full investigation into the murder spree. Investigators initially suspected Taborsky and Culombe were responsible for "one or two" murders in New York as well. Authorities deliberately housed the two separately, with Taborsky placed in the Hartford County jail and Culombe housed in Hartford's police barracks. On February 27, Culombe confessed to participating in eight holdups and six murders. Culombe led investigators to the murder weapon the two used to kill Kurpiewski and Janowski, which police raked out of a shallow pond. In Culombe's initial confession, he stated Taborsky fired all the fatal shots and that he only participated in pistol-whipping several victims and driving the pair's getaway cars. Police stated that Culombe possessed an "uncanny memory of details" when confessing to the crimes and gave investigators a "tour" to the various crime scenes and locations where he and Taborsky had abandoned weapons.

While Taborsky refused to confess to any part of his involvement in the crime spree at first, jail guards at the Hartford County jail stated that Taborsky learned about Culombe's confession through reading a local newspaper and seemed "surprised" to find out about how detailed Culombe was in his confession. On March 1, Lieutenant Rome encouraged Taborsky's mother to speak to him while their conversation was surreptitiously recorded. Taborsky then confessed to the murders of Kurpiewski and Janowski. Taborsky eventually confessed to the rest of the murders in the 1956–1957 spree, as well as to the 1950 murder of Louis Wolfson. Police stated that Taborsky's confession largely corroborated that of Culombe, although there were some unspecified "discrepancies". Later, Taborsky stated that he liked shooting his victims in the head because he was under the erroneous belief that gunshot wounds to the head would strip bullets of identifying ballistics evidence. Cumulatively, the robberies during the killing spree netted Taborsky and Culombe less than $400.

Following Taborsky's confession to Wolfson's murder, Wolfson's widow criticized Connecticut officials for releasing Taborsky: "God help those poor families for what they've got to go through. . . . Why? Why? Why did they let [Taborsky] go?" She also stated that negative sentiments directed towards her family in Hartford during Taborsky's first imprisonment on death row made her family feel "like criminals" and encouraged her to move from Hartford to Brooklyn, New York. Louis Wolfson's surviving brother and sister also expressed their disappointment at Taborsky's 1955 release, stating that while his confession "[took] away every shadow of a doubt," they also felt "sorry for all those other families that have to go through what we did."

After both Taborsky and Culombe issued their confessions, a 46-year-old pawn broker from Hartford was arrested and charged with selling Culombe seven pistols, at least three of which were used during the murder spree.

== Legal proceedings ==
Taborsky and Culombe jointly went on trial in May 1957. The state only tried them for the murders of Edward Kurpiewski and Daniel Janowski. Culombe's attorney attempted to use his mental disabilities to convince the jury to vote against the death penalty for his client, stating to the jury, "I can't believe that any American jury would return a first degree verdict and send Arthur Culombe to the electric chair." Taborsky's defense attorney attempted to argue that the murder spree was partially retributive due to the four years he spent on death row, noting that Taborsky told a prison psychiatrist, "When I kill another human being, they didn't think it was wrong when they wanted to kill me." One of Taborsky's defense attorneys attempted to argue that Taborsky had a lifelong mental illness that rendered him unable to differentiate between right and wrong. A psychiatrist Taborsky's defense attorneys hired stated Taborsky's motive for committing murder against his robbery victims was to convince the state to execute him and that he was therefore "a psychotic" who was "unable to distinguish between reality and fantasy." Dr. Harold Bancroft, a psychiatrist testifying for the prosecution, disputed the defense's contention that Taborsky's motive was indicative of psychosis, stating that Taborsky robbed people due to his desire for money and killed them to eliminate witnesses due, in part, to his distinctive appearance. Dr. Bancroft also disputed the defense's argument that Taborsky's initial four-year death row imprisonment played a role in the murders. Observers at the trial said Taborsky laughed at gruesome evidence and made "threatening gestures" towards trial attendees. At the time, Taborsky and Culombe's murder trial was the longest in Connecticut's history, with jury selection taking five weeks and other trial proceedings taking an additional five weeks.

Taborsky's and Culombe's trials ended on June 27, 1957, when the jury convicted both of first degree murder and rendered death sentences against both Taborsky and Culombe. Following their convictions, the Hartford Courant published an editorial in support of the death penalty for both defendants: "If ever capital punishment is justified, it is justified for these two."

While on death row, Taborsky attempted suicide twice in 1959, with both attempts being thwarted by prison guards. Taborsky advocated for the death penalty against himself, writing to Governor Ribicoff in a letter, "It is more humane to kill a convict than to make him suffer years of imprisonment." The Connecticut Supreme Court upheld both Taborsky and Culombe's death sentences in March 1960, after which both condemned men's executions were scheduled to take place on May 17, 1960. Taborsky waived all remaining appeals and rejected an opportunity to plead for clemency to the Board of Pardons; he is considered an execution volunteer as a result. Taborsky was executed shortly after 10:30 p.m. on May 17, 1960.

Culombe continued to fight his death sentence and escalated his appeals to the federal level, thus postponing his execution date the week before he was scheduled to die with Taborsky. On June 19, 1961, the Supreme Court of the United States overturned his conviction based on an argument in his appeal that police had violated his constitutional rights by using excessively aggressive tactics during his initial interrogation, in addition to investigators questioning Culombe for four days without the presence of an attorney. Due to the nature of Culombe's appeal and overturned conviction, Connecticut officials believed it would be difficult to obtain a first degree murder conviction or death sentence on any of the six murders in which Culombe had participated, so they offered him a plea deal for second degree murder, and he accepted the plea, thereby exempting himself from capital punishment. Culombe was officially re-sentenced to life imprisonment on June 30, 1961.

== Impact and aftermath ==
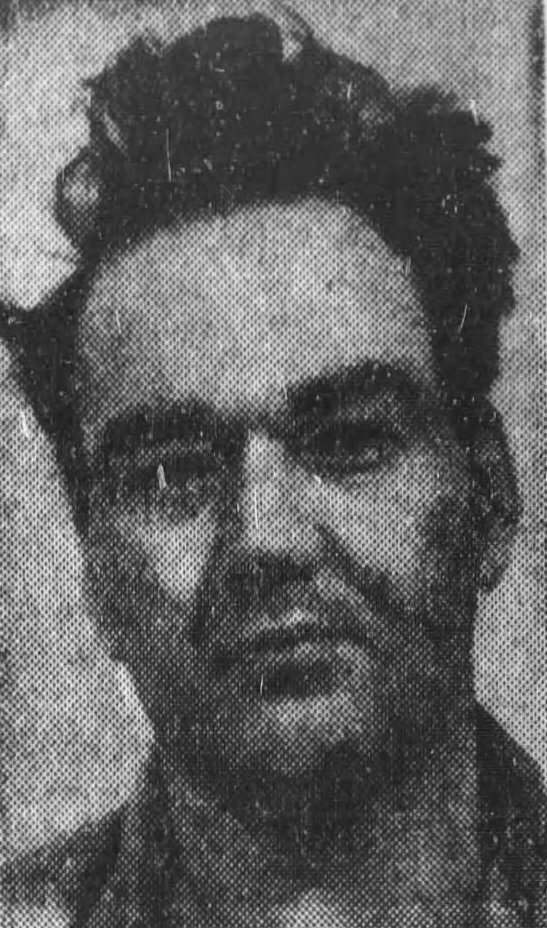
Mugshot of Arthur Culombe, c. 1961

In 1969, Culombe petitioned unsuccessfully for courts to apply four years and four months of time served to his life sentence so his parole eligibility date would occur sooner. Culombe petitioned for his freedom in 1970, but the state Board of Pardons rejected his petition because inmates under life sentences needed to serve at least 20 years in prison before the board would consider them for parole eligibility. Culombe died in prison on December 22, 1970, at the age of 46. Officials determined that he died in his cell of natural causes and posited he had an undetected brain tumor.

Newspapers described the killings as having a "chilling effect" on Connecticut's citizens. As a direct result of the Mad Dog killings, Connecticut's liquor stores implemented modified hours of operation, closing at 9:00 p.m. rather than their previous closing time of 11:00 p.m. A decade after the killing spree and years after Taborsky's execution, liquor store owners successfully lobbied for stores to close at 8:00 p.m., a change which was reversed in 2003.

The Mad Dog killings had a significant effect on Connecticut's death penalty, which was waning in popularity shortly before the spree took place. Prior to the murders, from late 1954 to March 1955, the Hartford Courant published an editorial series calling for an end to capital punishment within the state. Also in 1955, less than two years prior to the spree, Governor Ribicoff stated his opposition to the death penalty and called for its abolition, announcing his intent to sign legislation to abolish capital punishment in Connecticut if the state legislature would pass such a bill, which they ultimately declined to do before the Mad Dog killing spree began. On February 18, 1957, shortly before the arrests of Taborsky and Culombe, Governor Ribicoff announced his support for the death penalty in their case, while the Hartford Courant published a follow-up editorial, dated February 19, 1957, in which they too reversed their previous position: "Capital punishment is not a deterrent. It is not a punishment. But in certain situations, it is like putting out a fire, or killing a mad dog." Louis Wolfson's widow, who moved her family out of Connecticut after her husband's murder, criticized death penalty abolitionists after the killers' arrests, stating, "How does it feel to know that you and others like you helped a man commit more murders when you could have stopped him after the first?" State representative and probate judge Charles Henchel, who opposed capital punishment, wrote in early 1957 that the murder spree created "a wave of emotionalism that precludes successes for those who want capital punishment abolished."

Months before the execution of serial killer Michael Bruce Ross in 2005, the Courant published an editorial stating that the Mad Dog killings were "the principal reason there was still a death penalty on the books" by the time Ross began murdering in 1982. Historian and University of Connecticut professor Lawrence B. Goodheart also posited in 2011 that Taborsky and Culombe's killing spree fostered a culture in Connecticut that was unique among New England states as, save for Connecticut, the region largely opposed and restricted the death penalty: "The legacy of the 'mad dog killers' has lasted for a half century, making Connecticut distinct in New England". Connecticut was the only state in New England to carry out the death penalty after 1955, which, in 2014, the Hartford Courant credited partially to the Mad Dog killing spree. In 2023, a writer for Connecticut Magazine posited the state might have abolished the death penalty sooner if not for the killing spree.

That said, Connecticut was not the only state in New England with the death penalty at the time. New Hampshire also had the death penalty. After a series of high-profile murder cases, Massachusetts came within one vote of reinstating it in 1997.

In 2021, one of Lieutenant Samuel Rome's relatives donated Taborsky's confession tapes to the Connecticut State Police Museum. The museum's president, Jerry Longo, responded, "Reading that [Samuel] Rome obtained a confession from someone is a hell of a lot different than listening to a tape of a confession of a murder. It isn't something you can quantify unless you hear it – how cold [Taborsky] was."

== Victims ==
Killed:

- Louis L. Wolfson, 40 (March 26, 1950)
- Edward Kurpiewski, 30 (December 15, 1956)
- Daniel Janowski, 30 (December 15, 1956)
- Samuel H. Cohn, 65 (December 26, 1956)
- Mr. Bernard Speyer, 48 (January 5, 1957)
- Mrs. Ruth Speyer, 45 (January 5, 1957)
- John M. Rosenthal, 69 (January 26, 1957)

Survived:

- Jack Rosen (December 4, 1956)
- Peter Barone (December 11, 1956)
- Nickola Leone, 67 (December 15, 1956)
- Arthur Vinton, 64 (December 21, 1956)
- Mrs. Arthur Vinton, 62 (December 21, 1956)
- Lorry, 3 (December 21, 1956)
- Frank Adinolfi, 44 (January 6, 1957)

== See also ==
- List of people executed in the United States in 1960
