= Upright jerker =

Execution method

The upright jerker was an execution method and device intermittently used in the United States during the 19th and early 20th century. Intended to replace hangings, the upright jerker did not see widespread use and was phased out in the 1930s.

As in a hanging, a cord would be wrapped around the neck of the condemned. However, rather than dropping down through a trapdoor, the condemned would be violently jerked into the air by means of a system of weights and pulleys. The objective of this execution method was to provide a swift death by breaking the condemned's neck. The warden of the Connecticut State Prison at Wethersfield, Jabez L. Woodbridge, obtained US patent 541409, issued on June 18, 1895, for one such "automatic gallows".

Executions of this type took place in several U.S. states, notably Connecticut, where among others murderer and gang member Gerald Chapman was put to death by the method. The upright jerker was never very efficient at breaking the condemned's neck. Instead, the condemned would often be strangled. In one such case, a man by the name of James Stephens was left contorting and gurgling for minutes until he finally died of asphyxiation. Another upright jerker was installed in Fergus County, Montana, and used for a single execution in 1900.

== See also ==
- Capital punishment in Connecticut
