= Capital punishment in Connecticut =

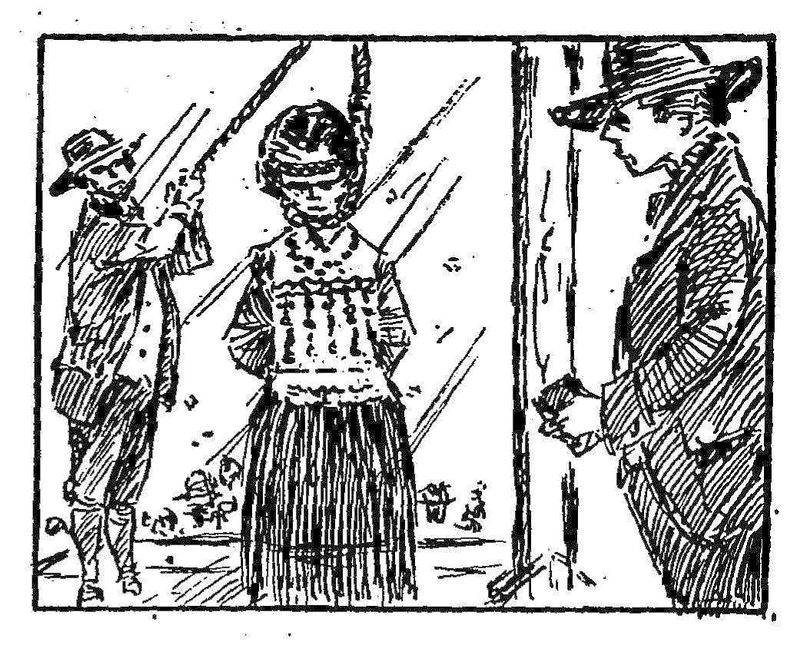
Execution of Hannah Ocuish in 1786

Capital punishment in Connecticut formerly existed as an available sanction for a criminal defendant upon conviction for the commission of a capital offense. Since the 1976 United States Supreme Court decision in Gregg v. Georgia until Connecticut repealed capital punishment in 2012, Connecticut had only executed one person, Michael Bruce Ross in 2005. Initially, the 2012 law allowed executions to proceed for those still on death row and convicted under the previous law, but on August 13, 2015, the Connecticut Supreme Court ruled that applying capital punishment only for past cases was unconstitutional.

== History ==
Between 1639 and 2005, Connecticut performed at least 139 executions. 36 executions occurred in Connecticut Colony, prior to its statehood. The remaining executions occurred after Connecticut's 1788 admission to the Union as the fifth state. Contrary to popular belief, Adonijah Bailey was not the oldest person ever to be executed in Connecticut, at age 79 in 1824; instead, he was tried and sentenced to death at age 80 in January 1825 for the murder of Jeremiah W. Pollock, and hanged himself on May 24, over two weeks before he was to be executed. The oldest person ever to be executed in Connecticut is Gershon Marx, who was hanged for murder at the age of 73, on May 18, 1905.

== Modern era ==
After Furman v. Georgia, Connecticut reinstated capital punishment on October 1, 1973. Lethal injection became the method mandated to execute condemned prisoners, replacing the electric chair, which had not been used since Taborsky's execution in 1960.

Unlike most of the other states, the Governor of Connecticut cannot commute the death sentence imposed under state law or pardon a death row inmate. This is determined by the Board of Clemency, on which the Governor does not sit. The other states where the Board has sole authority are Georgia and Idaho.

=== Repeal ===
On May 22, 2009, the Connecticut General Assembly passed a bill that would abolish capital punishment, albeit it would not retroactively apply to the eleven current Connecticut death row inmates or those convicted of capital crimes committed before the repeal went into effect. The bill was vetoed by Governor Jodi Rell.

On April 11, 2012, the Connecticut House of Representatives voted to repeal capital punishment for future cases (leaving past death sentences in place). The Connecticut Senate had already voted for the bill, and on April 25 Governor Dannel Malloy signed the bill into law. That made Connecticut the 17th state in the US without capital punishment, and the fifth state to abolish capital punishment in five years. In 2015 the state Supreme Court ruled that applying capital punishment only for past cases was unconstitutional, definitively ending it in Connecticut.

=== Cheshire murder case ===
One notable capital case in Connecticut was the Cheshire home invasion murders. The two murderers, Steven Hayes and Joshua Komisarjevsky, were both sentenced to death for the crime, and were among the inmates who had their sentences reduced as result of the state supreme court ruling. Survivor Dr. Petit condemned the state's decision to abolish capital punishment and spare the two criminals.

== Capital crimes ==
Murder with special circumstances, also called capital felony, was the only capital crime in Connecticut. These include any of the following:

1. Murder while the victim was acting within the scope of his duties, a police officer, Division of Criminal Justice inspector, state marshal exercising his statutory authority, judicial marshal performing his duties, constable performing law enforcement duties, special policeman, conservation or special conservation officer appointed by the environmental protection commissioner, Department of Correction (DOC) employee or service provider acting within the scope of his employment in a correctional facility and the perpetrator is an inmate, or firefighter
2. Murder committed by a defendant who is hired to commit the same for pecuniary gain or murder committed by one who is hired by the defendant to commit the same for pecuniary gain
3. Murder committed by one who has previously been convicted of intentional murder or of murder committed in the course of commission of a felony
4. Murder committed by one who was, at the time of commission of the murder, under sentence of life imprisonment
5. Murder by a kidnapper of a kidnapped person during the course of the kidnapping or before such person is able to return or be returned to safety
6. Murder committed in the course of the commission of sexual assault in the first degree
7. Murder of two or more persons at the same time or in the course of a single transaction
8. Murder of a person under 16 years of age

== Executions ==
During the 366 years between 1639 and 2005, Connecticut has performed a total of 127 executions. This averages to be approximately one execution every three years. The only person to be executed since 1960 has been the serial killer and rapist Michael Bruce Ross on May 13, 2005, for the kidnapping, rapes and murders of Robin Stavinsky, April Brunais, Wendy Baribeault, and Leslie Shelley.

=== Notable executions ===
Several notable executions have occurred in both Connecticut Colony and in the state of Connecticut, as indicated below.

- Hannah Ocuish – Ocuish, a 12-year-old girl, was hanged for murder despite her age and intellectual disability.
- Gerald Chapman — Chapman, a Prohibition-era gangster known as "The Count of Gramercy Park", was the first criminal to be dubbed "Public Enemy Number One" by the press. Convicted of the October 12, 1924, murder of police officer James Skelly in New Britain, Chapman was executed by upright jerker on April 6, 1926 at the state prison in Wethersfield.
- Frank Wojculewicz – Wojculewicz was found guilty of the 1951 murders of a police officer and a bystander. Wojculewicz became unable to walk after sustaining gunshot wounds in the same shooting that led to the murders, and despite his disability, Wojculewicz was sentenced to death and executed on October 26, 1959.
- Michael Bruce Ross — The execution of Ross in 2005 was the first and last in Connecticut (and in all of New England) since 1960. It was also the only execution administered by lethal injection in Connecticut and New England. Ross, a serial killer, was convicted of murdering eight women and girls between 1981 and 1984 and raping seven of them.

== Death row ==
The male death row was located at the Northern Correctional Institution. In 1995 the male death row moved from Osborn Correctional Institution to Northern. The execution chamber was located at Osborn. The York Correctional Institution housed all female prisoners in the state, but no women were on death row.

== See also ==
- List of people executed in Connecticut
- Cheshire, Connecticut, home invasion murders
- Crime in Connecticut
- Law of Connecticut
